= Remittance advice =

Letter from a customer to a supplier upon paying an invoice

Remittance advice is a letter sent by a customer to a supplier to inform the supplier that their invoice has been paid. If the customer is paying by cheque, the remittance advice often accompanies the cheque. The advice may consist of a literal letter (e.g., "To Whom it May Concern: Your shipment of the 10th inst was received in good order; accompanying is our remittance of $52.47 per invoice No 83046") or of a voucher attached to the side or top of the cheque.

Remittance advices are not mandatory, however they are seen as a courtesy because they help the accounts-receivable department to match invoices with payments. The remittance advice should therefore specify the invoice numbers for which payment is tendered.

In countries where cheques are still used, most companies' invoices are designed so that customers return a portion of the invoice, called a remittance advice, with their payment. In countries where wire transfer is the predominant payment method, invoices are commonly accompanied by standardized bank transfer order forms (like acceptgiros (in Dutch) (Netherlands) and Überweisungen (in German) (Germany) which include a field into which the invoice or client number can be encoded, usually in a computer-readable way. The payer fills in his account details and hands the form to a clerk at, or mails it to, his bank, which will then transfer the money.

The employee who opens the incoming mail should initially compare the amount of cash received with the amount shown on the remittance advice. If the customer does not return a remittance advice, an employee prepares one. Like the cash register tape, the remittance advice serves as a record of cash initially received.

Modern systems will often scan a paper remittance advice into a computer system where data entry will be performed. Modern remittance advices can include dozens, or hundreds of invoice numbers, and other information.

Remittance advices can be very complicated, especially in specialized fields like medical insurance payments.

== See also ==
- Pay stub
- Lock box
- Letter of transmittal
