= Bills C-1 and S-1 =

Pro forma bills in the Parliament of Canada

Bills C-1 and S-1 are pro forma bills introduced in the House of Commons and Senate respectively at the opening of each session of the Parliament of Canada. The bills are given a first reading and are then never proceeded with further. Being pro forma pieces of legislation, introducing them is mostly a formal tradition. They are introduced each session in the Commons and Senate for the purpose of reasserting the right of Members to depart from the reasons for summoning Parliament contained in the Speech from the Throne and to proceed with such business before considering the Speech, therefore signifying Parliament's freedom from the direction of the Crown of Canada.

== History ==
The introduction of a pro forma bill is a practice that has existed since before Confederation. It originated in the English House of Commons in 1558. As in the current Canadian practice, the bill in the English (later British) House was meant to show that the House could choose in which order to conduct its business regardless of what was in the throne speech. Originally, a normal bill was used for this purpose, but in 1727 the House began to use a pro forma bill called the Outlawries Bill for this specific purpose.

In the House, Bill C-1 is normally introduced by the prime minister and is titled An Act respecting the Administration of Oaths of Office (French: Loi concernant la prestation de serments d'office). In the Senate, Bill S-1 is titled An Act relating to Railways (French: Loi concernant les chemins de fer). The two differ only in title, and their text does not concern railways or oaths of office.

Bill C-1 was ordered printed on January 26, 2009, in the second session of the 40th Parliament, possibly for the first time. In previous sessions of Parliament, it seems the bill was not ordered printed. As a result, the text of Bill C-1 is available on the Parliament of Canada website, although it is not available for any previous session. Bill S-1 is also available.

== 2009 text ==
Where bills C-1 and S-1 differ in wording, this is indicated with angle brackets as follows: ⟨C-1 wording / S-1 wording⟩.

Whereas the introduction of a pro forma bill in the ⟨House of Commons / Senate⟩ before the consideration of the Speech from the Throne demonstrates the right of the ⟨elected representatives of the people / Senate⟩ to act without the leave of the Crown;

Whereas that custom, which can be traced to ⟨1558 / before 1867⟩ in the Parliament at Westminster, is practised in a number of jurisdictions having a parliamentary form of government;

And whereas it is desirable to explain and record the constitutional relationship represented by that custom;

Now, therefore, Her Majesty, by and with the advice and consent of the Senate and House of Commons of Canada, enacts as follows:

1 This bill asserts the right of the ⟨House of Commons / Senate⟩ to give precedence to matters not addressed in the Speech from the Throne.

== Provincial and territorial equivalents ==
Pro forma bills in each provincial or territorial legislature
Province	Bill citation	Bill
Alberta		
British Columbia	Bill 1	An Act to Ensure the Supremacy of Parliament
Manitoba	Bill 1	An Act respecting the Administration of Oaths of Office
Newfoundland and Labrador		
New Brunswick	Bill 1	An Act to Perpetuate a Certain Ancient Right
Northwest Territories		
Nova Scotia	Bill 0	An Act Respecting Oaths of Office
Nunavut		
Ontario	Bill 1	An Act to perpetuate an ancient parliamentary right
Prince Edward Island		
Quebec		
Saskatchewan		
Yukon	Bill 1	Act to Perpetuate a Certain Ancient Right

== See also ==
- Outlawries Bill, traditional first bill in the British House of Commons
- Select Vestries Bill, traditional first bill in the British House of Lords
