= Zero-based budgeting =

Method of budgeting

Zero-based budgeting (ZBB) is a budgeting method that requires all expenses to be justified and approved in each new budget period. It was developed by Peter Pyhrr in the 1970s. This budgeting method analyzes an organization's needs and costs by starting from a "zero base" (meaning no funding allocation) at the beginning of every period. The intended outcome is to assess the efficient use of resources by determining if services can be provided at a lower cost. However, the saving comes at the expense of a complete restructuring every budget cycle. Although used at least partially in both government and the private sector, there is some doubt whether ZBB has ever been utilized to its fullest extent in any organization.

== Description ==
The zero-based budgeting method requires all expenses to be justified and approved in each new budget period, typically each year. The method analyzes an organization's needs and costs by starting from no funding allocation (a zero base) at the beginning of every period. The goal is assessment of the efficiency of resource usage, by determining if services can be provided at a lower cost.

=== History ===
As an accounting manager for Texas Instruments, Peter Pyhrr created zero-based budgeting to help incorporate strategic objectives into the budgeting process by tying them to functional areas. Under his system, costs are grouped and measured against the previous results and current expectations. This enables management to allocate funds by current needs instead of historical expenditures. Pyhrr was appointed by then-Georgia governor Jimmy Carter to manage the state's budgetary process.

=== Advantages and disadvantages ===
ZBB encourages companies to evaluate every department's funding, and their current needs rather than the momentum of the previous year's budget or previous expenditure. It can help remove redundant spending. Communication between departments can improve by involving employees in decision-making and budget prioritization. ZBB may be undertaken as a "rolling process" spread over several years so that only a limited number of departments or business functions are affected each year.

However, the development of the budget can take time, effort, and additional staff; the saving comes at the expense of a complete restructuring every budget cycle. It is possible for managers to present pet projects as "necessary" expenses. Departments can have difficulties justifying their budgets, due to uncertainties of market fluctuations. Managers have to spend more time on budgets that they would otherwise use for other duties. The time and training required for zero-based budgeting may mean managerial staff do not react to sudden changes to their operations, such as shifting markets or a departmental emergency. As a result, it may take longer for a company to allocate the necessary funding.

== Public sector usage ==
=== Background ===
In the United States, Texas Instruments was the first to develop zero-based budgeting for the private sector. Jimmy Carter, the then Governor of Georgia, applied the same method to the public sector while he prepared the state's 1973 fiscal budget. Three years later, after Carter was elected President of the United States, the federal government implemented zero-base budgeting in The Government Economy and Spending Reform Act of 1976. President Carter later required the adoption of zero-based budgeting by the federal government during the late 1970s. As stated later by the United States Government Accountability Office (GAO), "Zero-Base Budgeting (ZBB) was an executive branch budget formulation process introduced into the federal government in 1977. Its main focus was to optimize outputs available at alternative budgetary levels. Under ZBB, agencies were expected to set priorities based on the program results that could be achieved at alternative spending levels, one of which was to be below current funding."

For most US governments, the main users of ZBB are legislatures, government agencies, and the executive. Legislatures include congress, state legislatures, and city councils, which all require summarizing and focusing on public priorities and objectives. Agencies include the agency director and department managers, and they require more detailed information and focus on program implementation and efficiency. Lastly, the executive includes the President, governors, and mayor/city manager who focus on the needs of the legislature and agency. Although the legislative, the agency, and the executive have different focuses, they all have to address the effectiveness of current activities and whether they should be eliminated or reduced.

According to Peter Sarant, the former director of management analysis training for the US Civil Service Commission during the Carter ZBB implementation effort, ZBB means "different things to different people." Some definitions imply that zero-based budgeting is the act of starting budgets from scratch or requiring each program or activity to be justified from the ground up. However, in many large agencies a complete zero-base review of all program elements during one budget period is not feasible and would result in excessive paperwork. In many aspects, the "common misunderstanding" of ZBB resembles a "sunset review" process more than a traditional public sector ZBB process.

=== Components of a public sector ZBB analysis ===
In an overview of zero-based budgeting, there are three elements that make up the concept: decision unit determination (the formulation of a budget structure), decision package formulation (compilation of a budget request), and ranking of packages. Three components make up public sector ZBB: identification of funding levels for units (traditionally, a zero-base, current funding, and an enhanced service level), their impact on the unit using performance metrics, and ranking of the decision packages for funding levels. In many cases, program staffers were tasked to look for alternative models that could deliver services more efficiently at lower funding levels. The US General Accounting Office (GAO) reviewed past performance budgeting initiatives in 1997.

ZBB was officially eliminated in federal budgeting on August 7, 1981. "Some participants in the budget process, as well as other observers, attributed certain program efficiencies, arising from the consideration of alternatives, to ZBB. ZBB established within federal budgeting a requirement to: present alternative levels of funding; and link [them] to alternative results." This element of the ZBB budgeting process remained in effect through the Reagan, Bush and early Clinton administrations before being eliminated in 1994.

=== Defining the government program zero-base ===
There is often considerable confusion over the meaning of zero-base budgeting. There is no evidence that public sector ZBB has ever included "building budgets from the bottom up" and "reviewing every invoice" as part of the analysis. In discussions of ZBB, there is often confusion between a ZBB process and a sunset review process. In a sunset review, the entire function is eliminated unless evidence is provided of program effectiveness.

Sarant's definition of the zero-base, based on the federal training experience, is the minimum level of funding necessary to keep a program alive. Therefore, the minimal level is the "program or funding level below which it is not feasible to continue a programme... because no constructive contribution can be made toward fulfilling its objective." Identifying this level of program funding has been subjective and problematic.

Consequently, "some states have selected arbitrary percentages to ensure that an amount smaller than last year's request is considered. They do this by stipulating that one alternative must be 50, 80, or 90 percent of last year's request." This equates to analyzing the impact on program operations of a 10, 20 or 50 percent reduction in funding as the "zero bases" funding level.

=== Importance of performance measures ===
Performance measures are a key component of the ZBB process. At the core, it requires quality measures to analyze the impact of funding scenarios on program operations and outcomes. Without them, ZBB will not work because decision packages cannot be ranked. To perform a ZBB analysis, "alternative decision packages are prepared and ranked, thus allowing marginal utility and comparative analysis."

Traditionally, a ZBB analysis focused on three types of measures. These are "...effectiveness, efficiency, workload for each decision unit. Indirect or proxy indicators could be used if these systems did not exist or were under development."

=== Impact on government operations ===
According to the GAO, "Agencies believed that inadequate time had been allowed to implement the new initiative. The requirement to compress planning and budgeting functions within the time frames of the budget cycle had proven especially difficult, affecting program managers' ability to identify alternative approaches to accomplishing agency objectives. Some agency officials also believed that the performance information needed for ZBB analysis was lacking."

Also, according to the National Conference of State Legislatures: ZBB originally meant that all budget decisions are up for review every year. This, however, turned out to be too radical for any state government. The state government of Georgia, which began trying ZBB in 1971, used a modified form.

=== Use in the Chinese public sector ===
Western influence on budgeting was non-existent in China before 1993. It was during the 1990s that China began looking out for a new and modern form of budgeting for their country's nationwide budget reform, and ended up settling on ZBB. The concept of ZBB was first introduced to China at the beginning of the 1990s and was primarily focused on Hubei Province. A new policy was set in place to put ZBB into action there, known as the DBR, or the Departmental Budgeting Reform. According to Jun Ma, a professor at the University of Nebraska, the beginning years of ZBB in Hubei were a bit rocky as the DBR had not yet been implemented in all the state departments in Hubei. Only a few departments implemented the budgeting system, and the results of multiple departments using multiple budgeting systems were not good. It slowly became clear that using ZBB in a traditional sense would not work out. Officials in the Hubei province and the DBR began looking for ways to incorporate the best parts of ZBB and form a new budgeting system that would work for their needs. The result of this change was a Chinese-styled Target-Based Budgeting system. This form of budgeting required bureaucracies and agencies to submit a simple budget within a pre-set time limit. TBB, as a modified form of ZBB, has worked out moderately well for the Chinese government in Hubei over the years, but many problems still face the budgeting system.

Some number of issues ranging from the absence of a unified budget and certain expenditures that are somehow exempt from the ZBB process, to the influence or effects of political factors have been widely noted.

Although the Hubei Province has developed a thorough budget by combining expenditures and off-budget revenues into the budget, there yet remains certain types of expenses that are still under the control of certain individuals other than the government Finance Department. Because of this, the difficulty of prioritizing all the possible government programs becomes confusing. Political officials have always had a certain plan or change that they would like to implement that would greatly influence the prioritizing process of ZBB. Certain political officials could say they greatly support a certain program and would like the Finance Department to focus more money on that particular program whilst other political officials would think otherwise. Therefore, any real changes or improvements made will always face opposition unless they have unified political support. A large portion of spending is not included in the ZBB process, like operating expenses, personnel expenses, and government policies that start after the budget year.

=== Practical reforms ===
Two notable reforms to the ZBB process include having departments submit budget requests and the use of sunset legislation. Budget requests reflect a cut of a certain percentage, the current level of spending, and an increase of a certain percentage. This allows the opportunity of trading between departments of the funding of a lower priority of one department to a higher priority of another. Sunset legislation places certain programs implemented or that are currently being funded under review to determine efficiency, effectiveness and necessity.

== Use in the private sector ==
Carlos Brito, a protégé of Jorge Paulo Lemann, "brought to Anheuser-Busch the concept of zero-based budgeting" at Anheuser-Busch InBev as early as in the 1990s.

3G Capital has become successful using ZBB within their company. They employed similar cost management concepts in their subsequent acquisitions: Burger King, Tim Hortons, Heinz, Kraft Foods, and Popeyes Louisiana Kitchen. It triggered measures as drastic as cutting hundreds of management jobs and jettisoning corporate jets, to as simple as requiring employees to ask to make photocopies. This might have continued the subjective notion that the budgeting style is a fix-all for businesses trying to lighten the load of a new company. Following the 2015 merger of Kraft and Heinz, some analysts and former employees blamed 3G Capital's use of ZBB for the company's poor performance.

=== Impact of ZBB on stockholders ===
According to Accenture,

examples of companies that have successfully implemented ZBB...include a consumer goods company that was able to achieve 18 percent savings and a 20 percent increase in the share price. Another case was that of a prominent commercial bank, which unlocked a large sum of money and reinvested it in "going digital" and a healthcare company that achieved savings of £1.2bn (€1.36bn) in three years.

Companies vocal about their use of ZBB programs in their earning calls are Mondelēz International, Campbell Soup Company, Kraft Heinz, Anheuser-Busch InBev, and Tesco. In its 2017 first-half results, Unilever reported that ZBB was improving its marketing productivity and streamlining its advertising spending, while also reducing unnecessary overhead costs. In another case, the use of ZBB within 3G Capital has been profitable for stockholders. When 3G Capital quickly cut costs within Kraft, their stock prices increased 36 percent. This type of budgeting enabled companies like Kraft to compete on price again with some of the leaner competition. Zero-based budgeting helps more money to flow to stockholders than into unused departments, over-funded programs, and wasteful spending habits.

== See also ==
- Corporate budget
- Envelope system
- Participatory budgeting
- Personal budget
- Program budgeting
- Zero deficit budget
