= ProjectWise =

Engineering project collaboration software

- Bentley ProjectWise CONNECT Edition
- Developer: Bentley Systems
- Stable release: 10.00.03.298 / 12/22/2020
- Operating system: Microsoft Windows
- Platform: Windows 7; Windows 8; Windows 10
- Available in: International
- Website: http://www.bentley.com/

ProjectWise is a suite of engineering project collaboration software from Bentley Systems designed for the architecture, engineering, construction, and owners/operator (AECO) industries. It helps project teams design, manage, review, share, and distribute engineering project content all within a single connected data environment (CDE). ProjectWise is a file and vendor agnostic solution capable of managing any type of CAD, BIM, geospatial, and project data. Direct CAD integration is also available for Bentley applications and other vendors and software titles including Autodesk & Microsoft Office.

== History ==
In August 1995, Bentley formalized a relationship with Opti inter-Consult, signed them as a strategic affiliate and took on a partial ownership in the company. Opti Inter-Consult was a small Finland-based company that was founded in 1990. It was the developer of TeamMate, which was a Document Management System exclusively distributed by Bentley. Opti Inter-Consult had a suite of products based on document management and facility management.

The following year, Bentley acquired the remaining shares of Opti Inter-Consult and split the two product lines in half. The facilities management products went to a newly formed joint venture with Primavera named WorkPlace Systems. WorkPlace Systems developed several products including ActiveAsset Manager, ActiveAsset Planner, and ActiveAsset Inquirer.

TeamMate was merged with Bentley development and in 1996 MicroStation TeamMate 96 was released. This version was focused on MicroStation support, but also handled other formats and applications such as Microsoft Office and AutoCAD. TeamMate also had metadata, file history, versions, and Query By Example to locate files.

In 1998, TeamMate was rebranded to the name ‘ProjectWise’. ProjectWise 3.xx was released early 2000 and over the next two years added features that included the Web Explorer Lite, which was the first web client. Document level security, DWG redlining, and the document creation wizard were also added.

ProjectWise V8 started the modern era of ProjectWise. The January 2003 release included such innovations as the Preview Pane, Workspace Profiles, Components, Audit Trail, and the Distribution System. Over the next few years we saw 2004 and V8 XM Edition ProjectWise releases. These releases included Full Text Search, Thumbnails, DGN Indexing, Managed Workspaces, and SharePoint Web Parts. Late in 2008, the first V8i release of ProjectWise was introduced. It included Delta File Transfer, the Web View Server, Spatial Navigation, the Quick Search tool bar, and auto login to integrated applications. Over the next several years, SELECTseries releases (one through four) have included Revit and Civil3D integration, as well at Transmittals, Dynamic Composition Server, Point Cloud Streaming, and Dynamic Plotting.

== Version History ==
Official name	version	release	date of release	comments
TeamMate	95	1	1995, June	
TeamMate 96	96	2	1996, December	
ProjectWise	02.01.xx.xx	3	1998, December	
ProjectWise	03.01.xx.xx	4	2000, May	Document Level Security
ProjectWise	03.02.xx.xx	5	2001, May	DWG Redlining, Windows Extensions, Document Creation Wizards, Web Explorer Lite
ProjectWise V8	08.01.xx.xx	6	2003, January	Audit Trail, updated Web Explorer Lite, Preview Pane, Workspace Profiles, Components, Distribution System
ProjectWise 2004	08.05.xx.xx	7	2004, May	New WEL, Full Text Search, Thumbnails, DGN Indexing
ProjectWise V8 XM	08.09.xx.xx	8	2006, June	SharePoint Web Parts, Projects, Managed Workspaces
ProjectWise V8i	08.11.xx.xx	9	2008, November	Delta File Transfer, Web View Server, Spatial Navigation, Quick Search Bar, Auto-login to integrated Apps
ProjectWise V8i (SELECTseries 1)	08.11.07.xx (08.11.07.107+)	10	2009, November	Windows 7, AutoCAD 2010, ProjectWise i-model Composer, Navigator Markups
ProjectWise V8i (SELECTseries 2)	08.11.07.xx (08.11.07.443+)	11	2010, July	SharePoint 2010, Dependency Services, PDx Dynamic Review, Revit Integration
ProjectWise V8i (SELECTseries 3)	08.11.09.xx (08.11.09.91)	12	2011, February	Navigator WebPart, AutoCAD & Revit 32/64-bit support, Granular Administration, Performance enhancements for high latency networks
ProjectWise V8i (SELECTseries 4)	08.11.11.xx (08.11.11.111)	13	2012, May	Native 64-bit server, Transmittals, Dynamic Composition Server, Citrix, ProjectWise Web Services, Point Cloud Streaming
ProjectWise V8i (SELECTseries 4 Update)	08.11.11.xx (08.11.11.559)	14	2013, April	Windows Server 2012, Windows 8, DGN & i-model view in client, Rules Engine, Dynamic Rights Management, i-Model viewer for SP3D
ProjectWise V8i (SELECTseries 4 Update 2)	08.11.11.xx (08.11.11.590)	15	2014, July	Integration On/Off buttons for Office and AutoCAD, Ability to view DGNs and i-models within ProjectWise Explorer's Preview Pane
ProjectWise CONNECT Edition (PWCE)	10.00.00.xx (10.00.00.15)	16	2015, September	PowerShell, Deliverables Management, Project Performance Dashboards, Project Sharing Services
ProjectWise CONNECT Edition (Update 1 Repost)	10.00.01.xx (10.00.01.67)	17	2016, August	Supports Oracle 12c and SQL Server 2014
ProjectWise CONNECT Edition (Update 2)	10.00.02.xx (10.00.02.96)	18	2017, March	Soft Delete, SSO for Cloud Hosting, Admin Audit Trail, MicroStation CE Managed Workspaces
ProjectWise CONNECT Edition (Update 2.2)	10.00.02.xx (10.00.02.265)	19	2017, June	Microstation/OpenRoads Designer/AECOsim Building Designer CE managed workspaces, Revit Advanced Integration features
ProjectWise CONNECT Edition (Update 2.3)	10.00.02.xx (10.00.02.320)	20	2017, September	ProjectWise Explorer Client update ONLY. MicroStation CONNECT Edition Update 6 (includes managed configurations support), AutoCAD 2018, AutoCAD Architecture 2018, AutoCAD Civil 3D 2018 (includes Civil 3D advanced integration), AutoCAD Map 3D 2018, AutoCAD MEP 2018
ProjectWise CONNECT Edition (Update 3.0)	10.00.03.xx (10.00.03.49)	21	2018, February	Support for Windows Server 2016, SQL Server 2016, Azure SQL, MicroStation CONNECT Edition Update 7, Revit Issues Resolutions and integration for ProjectWise Share, Server side Workflow Rules Engine (WRE),
ProjectWise CONNECT Edition (Update 3.1)	10.00.03.1xx (10.00.03.140)	22	2018, July	Network Configuration for Secure/Insecure login, Client local time zone display, iCS for PDF Job History
ProjectWise CONNECT Edition (Update 3.1 Refresh)	10.00.03.1xx (10.00.03.167)	23	2019, January	MicroStation and Powerplatform Integration Improvements, Revit Integration Improvements, AutoCAD Integration Improvements and PW Network Configuration Settings Enhancements
ProjectWise CONNECT Edition (Update 3.2)	10.00.03.2xx (10.00.03.262)	24	2019, June	Server-Side Processing for Work Rules Engine, Revit Integration Update, Deleted Items
ProjectWise CONNECT Edition (Update 3.2 Refresh)	10.00.03.2xx (10.00.03.271)	25	2019, November	Minor updates and bug fixes
ProjectWise CONNECT Edition (Update 3.2 Refresh)	10.00.03.2xx (10.00.03.280)	26	2020, March	Bug fixes
ProjectWise CONNECT Edition (Update 3.2 Refresh)	10.00.03.2xx (10.00.03.298)	27	2020, December	SQL 2019, Oracle 19c, WRE Server Side update, SQL Whitelist
ProjectWise CONNECT Edition (Update 3.2 Refresh 2)	10.00.03.2xx (10.00.03.299)			
ProjectWise CONNECT Edition (Update 3.3)	10.00.03.3xx (10.00.03.329)			
ProjectWise CONNECT Edition (Update 3.3 R2)	10.00.03.3xx (10.00.03.334)			
ProjectWise CONNECT Edition (Update 3.3 R2 Refresh)	10.00.03.3xx (10.00.03.336)			
ProjectWise CONNECT Edition (Update 3.4)	10.00.03.4xx (10.00.03.434)			
ProjectWise CONNECT Edition (Update 3.4 R2)	10.00.03.4xx (10.00.03.453)			
ProjectWise 2023	23.01.xx.xx			
