= Pro forma =

Latin for "as a matter of form" or "for the sake of form"

The term pro forma (Latin for "as a matter of form" or "for the sake of form") is most often used to describe a practice or document that is provided as a courtesy or satisfies minimum requirements, conforms to a norm or doctrine and tends to be performed perfunctorily or is considered a formality. The term is used in legal and business fields to refer to various types of documents that are generated as a matter of course.

== Accounting ==
Pro forma accounting is a statement of the company's financial activities while excluding "unusual and nonrecurring transactions" when stating how much money the company actually made. Examples of expenses often excluded from pro forma results are company restructuring costs, a decline in the value of the company's investments, or other accounting charges, such as adjusting the current balance sheet to fix faulty accounting practices in previous years.

There was a boom in the reporting of pro forma results in the US starting in the late 1990s, with many dot-com companies using the technique to recast their losses as profits, or at least to show smaller losses than the US GAAP accounting showed. The U.S. Securities and Exchange Commission requires publicly traded companies in the United States to report US GAAP-based financial results, and has cautioned companies that using pro forma results to obscure US GAAP results would be considered fraud if used to mislead investors.

== Business ==
=== Financial statements ===
In business, pro forma financial statements are prepared in advance of a planned transaction, such as a merger, an acquisition, a new capital investment, or a change in capital structure such as incurrence of new debt or issuance of stock.

The pro forma models the anticipated results of the transaction, with particular emphasis on the projected cash flows, net revenues and taxes. Consequently, pro forma statements summarize the projected future status of a company, based on the current financial statements. Pro forma figures should be clearly labeled as such and the reason for any deviation from reported past figures clearly explained.

For example, when a transaction with a material effect on a company's financial condition is contemplated, the finance department will prepare, for management and board review, a business plan containing pro forma financial statements demonstrating the expected effect of the proposed transaction on the company's financial viability. Lenders and investors will require such statements to structure or confirm compliance with debt covenants such as debt service reserve coverage and debt to equity ratios. Similarly, when a new corporation is envisioned, its founders will prepare pro forma financial statements for the information of prospective investors. Also, banks will request pro forma statements in lieu of tax returns for a start up business in order to verify cash flow before issuing a loan or line of credit.

=== Invoices ===
In trade transactions, a pro forma invoice is a document that states a commitment from the seller to sell goods to the buyer at specified prices and terms. It is used to declare the value of the trade. It is not a true invoice because it is not used to record accounts receivable for the seller and accounts payable for the buyer.

Simply, a "pro forma invoice" is a "confirmed purchase order" where buyer and supplier agree on the details and cost of the product to be shipped to the buyer. A pro forma invoice is generally raised when the seller is ready for dispatching the material but they want to ensure that the payment is being sent before dispatch. Similarly, the customer also wants to know which components are included in the pro forma invoice to avoid disagreements later.

A sales quote is prepared in the form of a pro forma invoice, which is different from a commercial invoice. It is used to create a sale and is sent in advance of the commercial invoice. The content of a pro forma invoice is almost identical to a commercial invoice and is usually considered a binding agreement, but because a pro forma invoice is not a legally-binding document, the price may change in advance of the final sale.

A pro forma invoice can also be used for shipments containing items that are not being bought or sold, such as gifts, samples and personal belongings, whereas a commercial invoice is used when the commodities shipped are being bought or sold. However, it is best to use a customs invoice or declaration as border officials require values for the export declaration. A customs invoice or declaration is commonly used in New Zealand for air parcel post shipments.

==== International trade ====
A pro forma invoice is the same as a commercial invoice, which, when used in international trade, represents the details of an international sale to customs authorities. A pro forma invoice is presented in the place of a commercial invoice when there is no sale between the sender and the importer (for example, in the case of an RMA for replacement goods), or if the terms of the sale between the seller and the buyer are such that a commercial invoice is not yet available at the time of the international shipment. A pro forma invoice is required to state the same facts that the commercial invoice would and the content is prescribed by the governments who are a party to the transaction.

In some countries, customs may accept a pro forma invoice (generated by the importer and not the exporter) if the required commercial invoice is not available at the time when filing entry documents at the port of entry to get goods released from customs. The U.S. Customs and Border Protection, for example, uses pro forma invoices to assess duty and examine goods, but the importer on record is required to post a bond and produce a commercial invoice within 120 days of the date of entry. If the required commercial invoice is needed for statistical purposes, the importer has to produce the commercial invoice within 50 days of the date Customs releases the goods to the importer.

== Law ==
In law, pro forma court rulings are intended merely to facilitate the legal process (indeed to move matters along).

== Government ==
=== Westminster system ===
In certain Commonwealth nations with a Westminster system, such as the United Kingdom, Canada, and Australia, pro forma bills are introduced immediately before consideration of the speech from the throne. Pro forma bills are incomplete pieces of legislation and undergo only the first reading stage. They symbolize the authority of the parliament to discuss matters other than those specified by the head of state, for which ostensibly parliament was summoned. After first reading, the bill is never considered further. The pro forma bill was first introduced in the House of Commons of England in 1558.

In the Parliament of the United Kingdom, the equivalents are the Outlawries Bill in the House of Commons and the Select Vestries Bill in the House of Lords. In the Parliament of Canada, such bills are titled Bill C-1, An Act respecting the Administration of Oaths of Office, and Bill S-1, An Act relating to Railways in the House of Commons of Canada and Senate of Canada, respectively. In the Australian House of Representatives, a new bill (known as the "formal" or "privilege bill") is drafted at the start of each parliamentary term (e.g. in the 47th Parliament this was the Customs Amendment Bill 2022) and presented by the Prime Minister. The bill is read the first time and is printed (published), but, unlike normal bills, the second reading is not moved and remains on the agenda indefinitely. However, departing from British and Canadian tradition, the contents of the bills do address the matters referred to in its title, and could theoretically be enacted like any other normal bill. This practice does not extend to the Australian Senate; instead other formal business is conducted (such as question time and procedural motions) before consideration of the governor-general's speech.

=== United States ===
In the federal government of the United States, either house of the Congress (the House of Representatives or the Senate) can hold a pro forma session at which no formal business is expected to be conducted. This is usually to fulfill the obligation under the Constitution "that neither chamber can adjourn for more than three days without the consent of the other." Pro forma sessions can also be used to prevent the president from pocket-vetoing bills, or calling the Congress into special session. They have also been used to prevent presidents from making recess appointments.

In 2012 President Barack Obama attempted to make four appointments during a pro forma session, calling the practice of blocking recess appointments into question. However, in 2014 the Supreme Court of the United States in NLRB v. Noel Canning determined that the President had improperly used his presidential power to make these appointments, stating that while the Senate was in recess punctuated by pro forma sessions the period of time between the sessions was not long enough to invoke such power.

In April 2020, President Donald Trump claimed that the president's constitutional power under Article II, Section 3 empowered him to suspend both houses of Congress (overriding the pro forma procedure), thus enabling him to make appointments to vacant government positions while Congress is suspended. Article II, Section 3 enables the president to "convene or adjourn Congress" ... "on extraordinary occasions", a power that has never been used to adjourn Congress, though it has been used on rare occasions to convene Congress. The suggestion was condemned by former Clinton Press Secretary Joe Lockhart and quickly shot down by the Republican Senate leader Mitch McConnell. In addition, the president's constitutional power to adjourn either or both houses of Congress is limited to situations in which the "Time of Adjournment" is disagreed upon between the House and Senate, creating a "Case of Disagreement", which implicates Article I, Section 5, of the Constitution. This section prohibits either house of Congress from adjourning for more than three days without the consent of the other house of Congress.

Similar practices exist in the state legislatures, and for similar reasons; for example, in Minnesota, legislative bodies have the same every-three-days meeting requirement that Congress has. Pro forma sessions are held to meet this requirement.
