= Speech from the throne =

Monarch's speech outlining governmental agenda and opening the legislative session

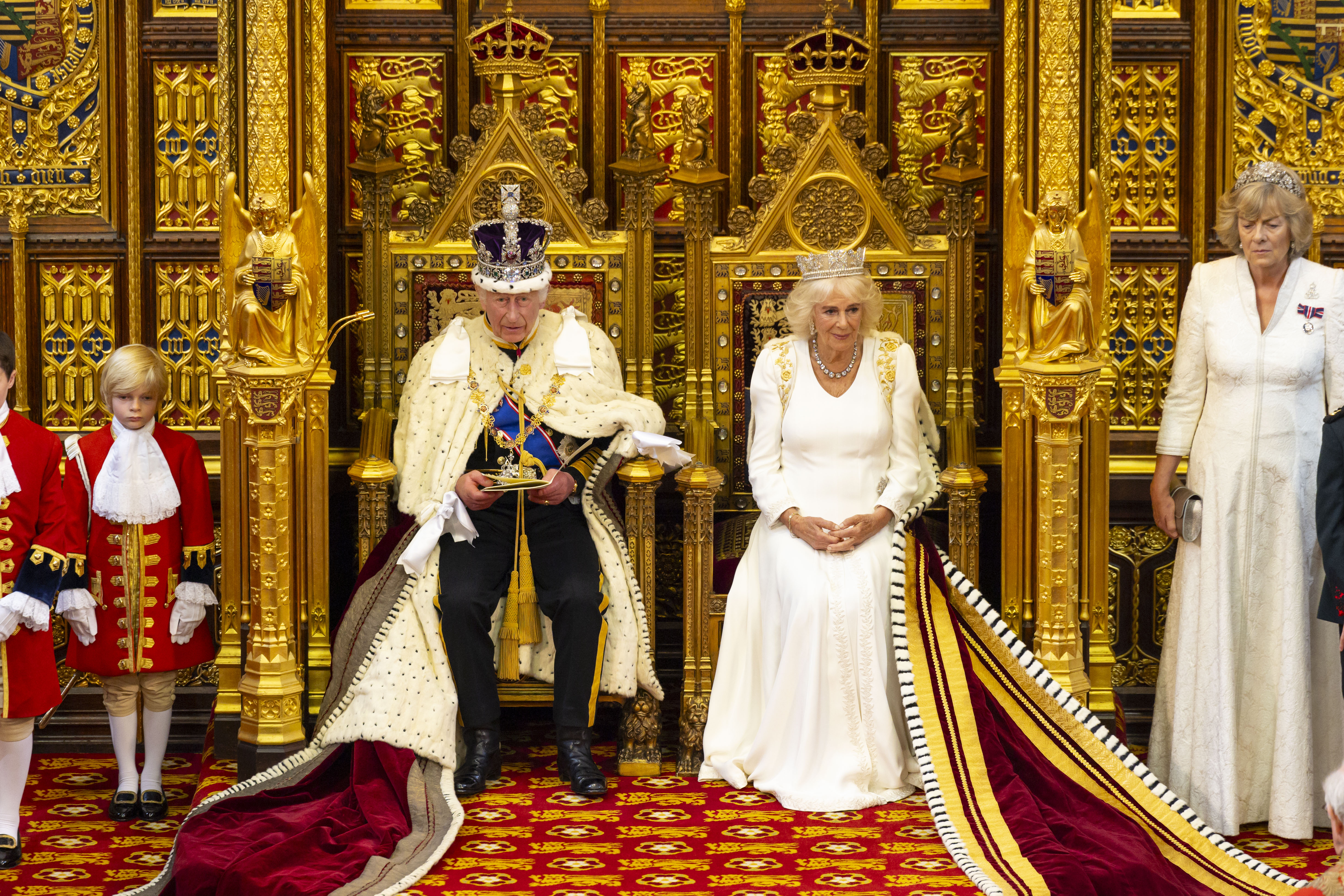
King Charles III reading the speech from the throne at the 2024 State Opening of Parliament in the United Kingdom

A speech from the throne, or crown speech, is an event in certain monarchies in which the reigning sovereign, or their representative, reads a prepared speech to members of the nation's legislature when a session is opened. The address sets forth the government's priorities for its legislative agenda, for which the cooperation of the legislature is sought. The speech is often accompanied by formal ceremony. It is often held annually, although in some places it may occur more or less frequently, whenever a new session of the legislature is opened.

Historically, when monarchs exercised personal influence and overall decision-making in government, a speech from the throne would outline the policies and objectives of the monarch; the speech was usually prepared by the monarch's advisers, but the monarch supervised the drafting of the speech at least to some extent and exercised final discretion as to its content. In modern constitutional monarchies, whether by law or by convention, the head of state or their representative reads the speech from the throne, but it is prepared by the ministers in cabinet. The event continues to be practiced in the Commonwealth realms, where it is also known as the King's Speech (or Queen's Speech if the reigning monarch is female) in the United Kingdom. In the Netherlands, it is held on Prince's Day.

In addition to monarchies, many republics have adopted a similar practice in which the head of state, often a president, addresses the legislature. In parliamentary republics where the president is merely a ceremonial figurehead, these speeches are often similar in tone to the throne speech of a constitutional monarchy, whereas in presidential systems, the speeches are somewhat different in that the president exercises personal discretion over the content. The principle of separation of powers means the legislature is not obligated to follow whatever agenda (if any) may be contained in such a speech.

== Commonwealth realms ==
=== Terminology ===
In the United Kingdom, the speech is known as His Majesty's Most Gracious Speech, the Gracious Address, or, less formally, the King's Speech (or Queen's Speech, when the reigning monarch is female). In Canada, it is known as the Speech from the Throne (often shortened to Throne Speech) (in French: Discours du Trône). Since 1973, the lieutenant governor of Quebec has delivered a short inaugural address termed the Allocution, after which the premier reads his or her Discours d'ouverture (Opening Speech), called the Message inaugural from 1974 to 1984.

In Hong Kong, the governor's address was termed the Policy Address during Chris Patten's governorship. In the Irish Free State, the governor-general delivered the Governor-General's Address to Dáil Éireann; only two were ever given, in 1922 and 1923.

=== History ===
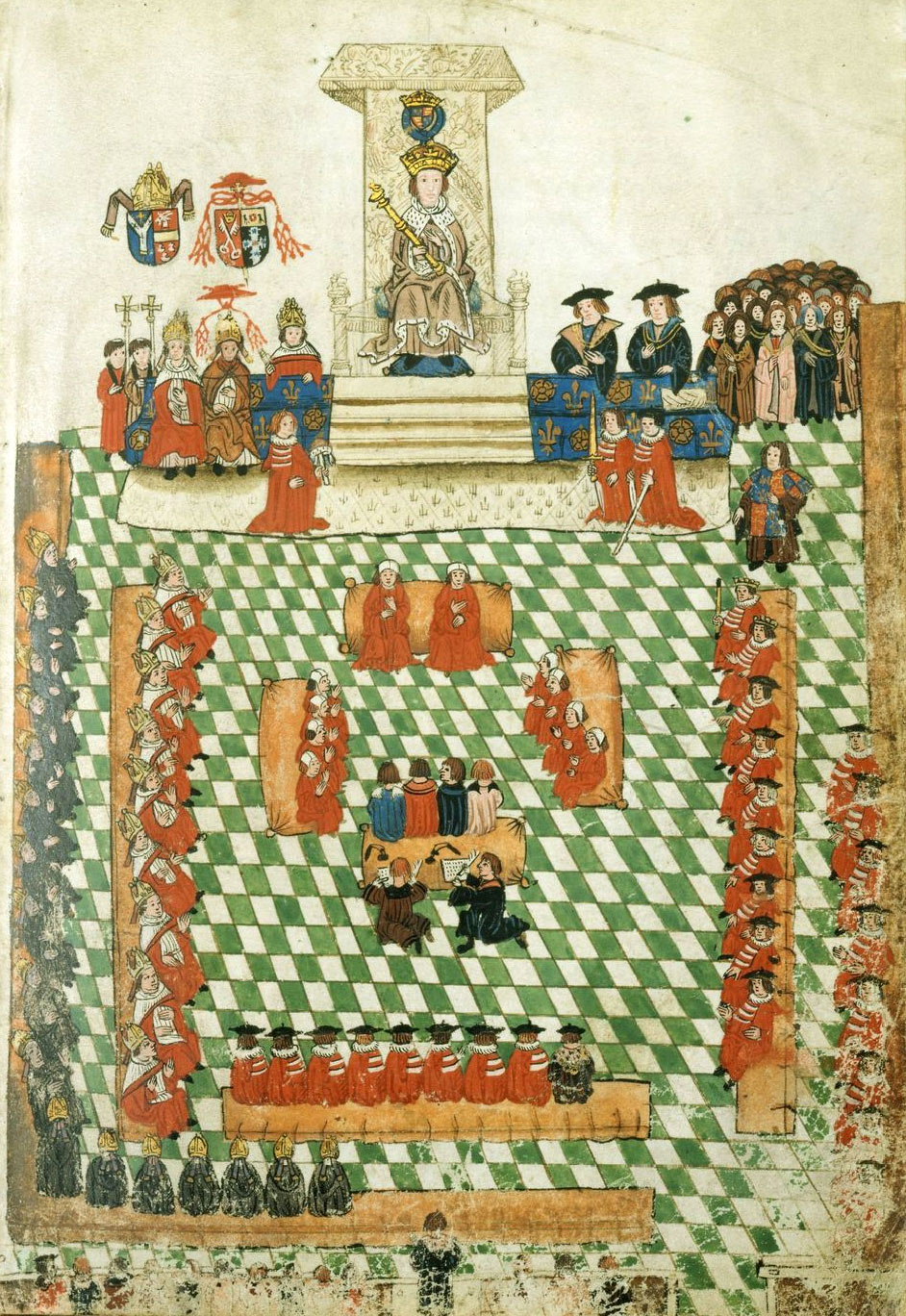
King Henry VIII at the opening of the Parliament of England at Bridewell Palace, 1523

In the Commonwealth realms, the speech from the throne is an oration that forms part of a ceremony marking the opening of parliament. Some records indicate the ceremony has taken place since the Middle Ages, while others place its origins in the 16th century, when England was still an absolute monarchy. The speech explained to parliament the reasons it was summoned and sometimes set out the sovereign's policies and objectives. The monarch would sometimes speak to parliament in person; Edward III (in 1365), Richard II, and Edward IV did so to both houses of parliament on multiple separate occasions.

However, various other figures gave the oration on the sovereign's behalf: between 1347 and 1363, it was read by the chief justice; in 1401 by the chief justice of the Common Pleas; in 1344, 1368, 1377 (speaking for a presiding Edward III), 1399, and 1422, by the archbishop of Canterbury; and in 1343, 1363, and, usually after 1368, by the lord chancellor who was then the prolocutor, or chairman of the House of Lords. It was given on his behalf by the bishop of Winchester in 1410; in 1453 and 1467, the bishop of Lincoln; the bishop of Rochester in 1472; and the keeper of the Privy Seal in 1431. It may have been written by or with the input of the king's or queen's advisers, but, the monarch, as supreme governor, was the principal author.

=== Contemporary practice ===
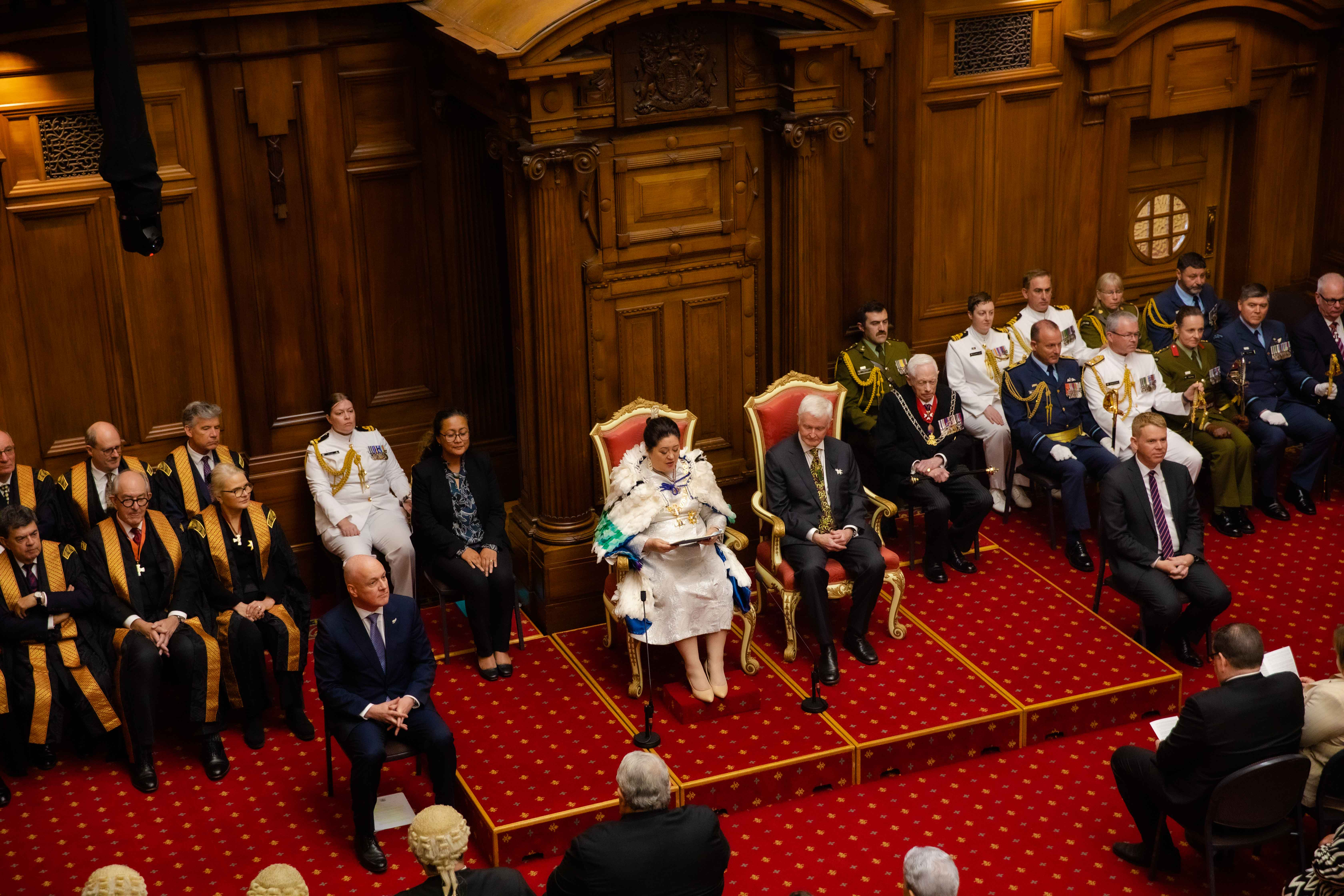
Governor General Dame Cindy Kiro delivers the Speech from the Throne in the former chambers of the Legislative Council, the abolished upper house of New Zealand's Parliament.

Today, within the tenets of constitutional monarchy, the speech is written by the sitting cabinet, with or without the reader's participation, and outlines the legislative programme for the new parliamentary session. Due to the parliamentary tradition of the sovereign being barred from the lower chamber, in those realms possessing a bicameral parliament, the ceremony takes place in the legislature's upper chamber, with members of both houses in attendance. In most unicameral parliaments, the speech is read in the one legislative chamber. Unusually, in the Irish Free State, the speech was delivered in the lower house of its bicameral parliament.

In the United Kingdom, the speech is typically read by the reigning sovereign at the State Opening of Parliament. Traditions surrounding the opening and the speech go back to the 16th century. The present ceremony dates from 1852, when the Palace of Westminster was rebuilt after the 1834 fire. The ceremony now usually occurs annually, usually in November or December, or soon after a general election. The monarch may, however, appoint a delegate to perform the task in his or her place. Elizabeth II did this during her pregnancies in 1959 and 1963, when it was delivered instead by the Lord Chancellor; and again due to ill health in 2022, when it was delivered by Prince Charles (now Charles III); he and Prince William were acting as Counsellors of State.

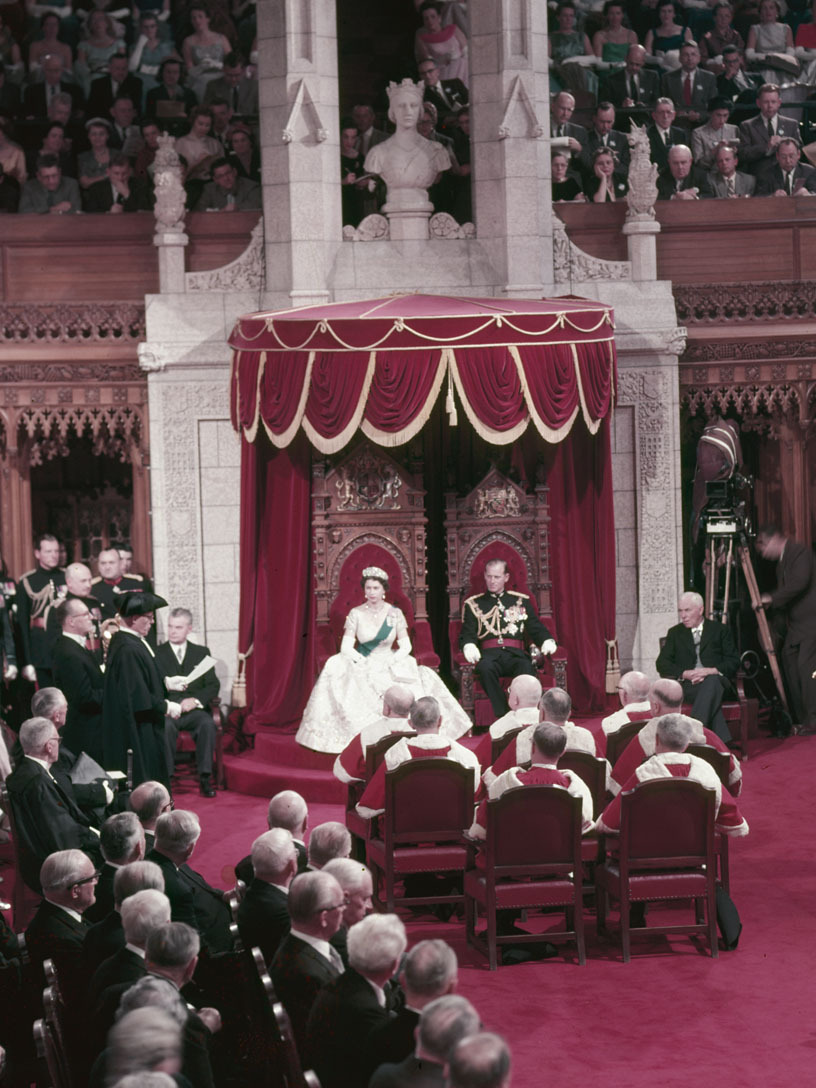
Queen Elizabeth II (left, seated with Prince Philip, Duke of Edinburgh, right) delivers the Speech from the Throne from the Canadian Senate throne, 1957.

In those countries that share a sovereign with the UK, the speech from the throne will usually be read on the monarch's behalf by his or her viceroy, the governor-general, although the monarch may deliver the address in person: Queen Elizabeth II read the Throne Speech in the Parliament of New Zealand in 1954, 1963, 1970, 1974, 1977, 1986, and 1990, the Parliament of Australia in 1954 and 1974, and the Parliament of Canada in 1957 and 1977. Another member of the royal family may also perform this duty, such as when, on 1 September 1919, the Prince of Wales (later King Edward VIII) read the Speech From the Throne in the Canadian parliament. On two occasions, the administrator of the Government delivered the address to the Parliament of Canada: 16 May 1963 and 30 September 1974. Charles III read the speech from the throne in Canada on 27 May 2025.

In the Australian states, the relevant governor reads the speech, though the Australian monarch may also perform the task: Queen Elizabeth II opened the parliaments of some of the Australian states in 1954 and of New South Wales in 1992. In almost all the Canadian provinces, the relevant lieutenant governor delivers the speech; it is uncertain whether the Canadian monarch can do the same in any legislature of a Canadian province. In Quebec, however, the speech is referred to as the "Opening Address" (French: Allocution d'ouverture). In each of the Canadian territories, the commissioner reads the Throne Speech or Opening Address to the legislature.

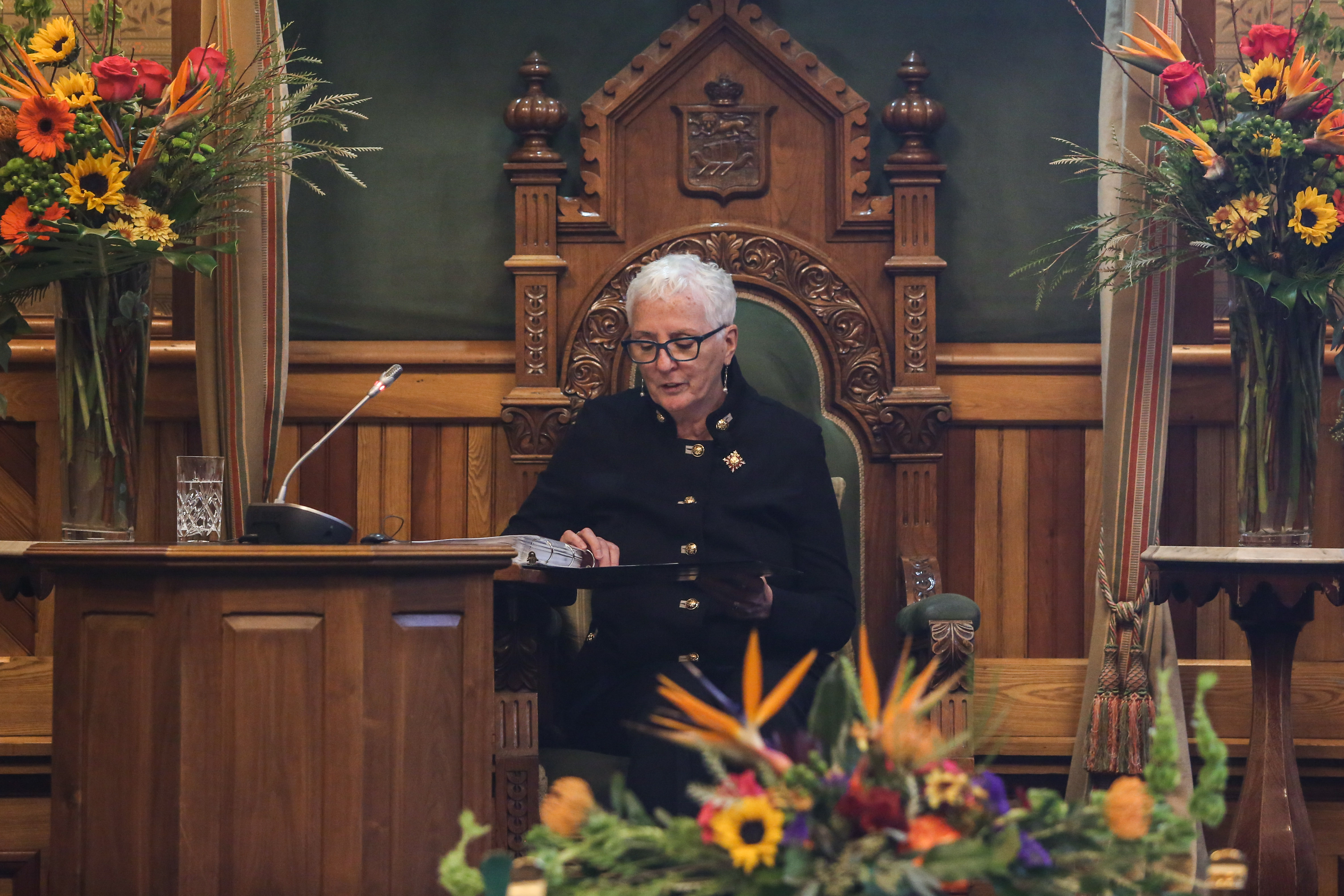
Brenda Murphy delivers the throne speech as the Lieutenant Governor of New Brunswick, the monarch's representative in that province.

In British overseas territories that have instituted this practice, the relevant governor delivers the speech. A throne speech is not typical in the devolved legislatures within the United Kingdom; the nearest equivalent is a statement of the legislative agenda of the executive branch, usually given by a first minister. However, the British monarch often undertakes visits and speaks to the devolved bodies in a less official capacity. During her reign Queen Elizabeth II was present and gave an address at all openings of the Scottish parliament, usually speaking reflectively upon its accomplishments and wishing the institution well for its coming term rather than considering the plans of the executive.

It is considered improper for the audience, including members of parliament, to show support or disapproval for any content of the speech while it is being read: that is reserved to the debate and vote that follows in legislative chambers or chamber. In 1998 in the UK, when the Queen read out the proposed House of Lords Act 1999, Labour Party MPs briefly interrupted it by vocalising support while Conservative peers responded with "shame!". Protest, though, has been expressed during a throne speech, such as when, in 2011, Brigette DePape, a page in the Canadian Senate, interrupted Governor General David Johnston's reading of the Speech From the Throne by standing and holding a sign calling for the then Prime Minister, Stephen Harper, to be stopped.

=== Address in reply ===
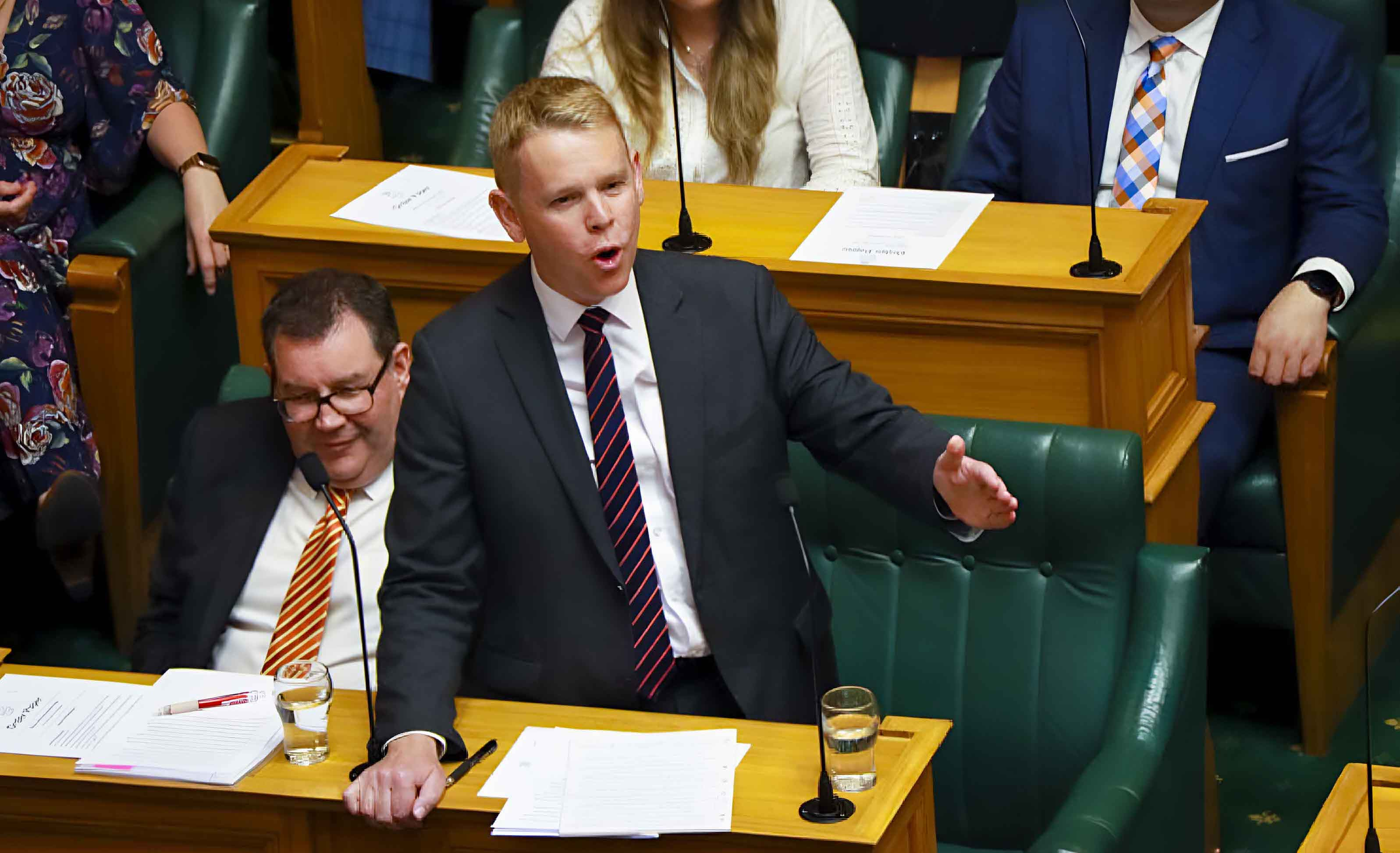
New Zealand's Leader of the Opposition, Chris Hipkins, speaks during the Address in Reply debate.

Formally, the motion that follows the speech merely calls on parliament to thank the monarch or viceroy via an Address in Reply. The debate is, however, often wide-ranging, exploring many aspects of the government's proposed policies, and spread over several days. When the Address in Reply is eventually voted on, the vote, if an amendment expressing lack of confidence in the monarch or viceroy's ministers is moved and carried, is held to constitute a Motion of no confidence in the government, resulting in the end of that government's mandate. In some legislatures, this discussion and vote is preceded by a symbolic raising of other matters, designed to highlight the independence of parliament from the Crown; a practice that originated after King Charles I was tried and executed by parliament. In the British House of Commons, the other business raised is by tradition the Outlawries Bill, while the House of Lords reads the Select Vestries Bill; neither proceeds past the first reading. In the House of Commons of Canada, the bill considered is Bill C-1, an Act Respecting the Administration of Oaths of Office, while in the Senate, it is Bill S-1, an Act Relating to Railways. The texts of these two bills have nothing to do with either oaths of office or railways; instead, they contain near-identical wordings that explain their pro forma function. In Australia and New Zealand, by contrast, no pro forma bills are introduced; there, the respective houses of representatives instead consider some brief and non-controversial business items before debating the Address in Reply.

== Other equivalents ==
=== Monarchies ===
==== Japan ====
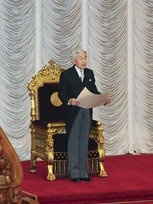
Emperor Akihito convoking the National Diet, 2011

In Japan, the emperor makes only a short speech of greeting during the National Diet opening ceremony; he does not refer to any government policies, instead allowing the Prime Minister to address political matters.

==== Malaysia ====
Malaysia also has the same practice, with the Yang di-Pertuan Agong making such an address to the Parliament of Malaysia in joint session during its state opening yearly every March.

==== Morocco ====
The king addresses parliament at the beginning of its yearly session on the second Friday of October. The speech may only be legally binding if it is read before both houses of parliament.

==== Netherlands ====
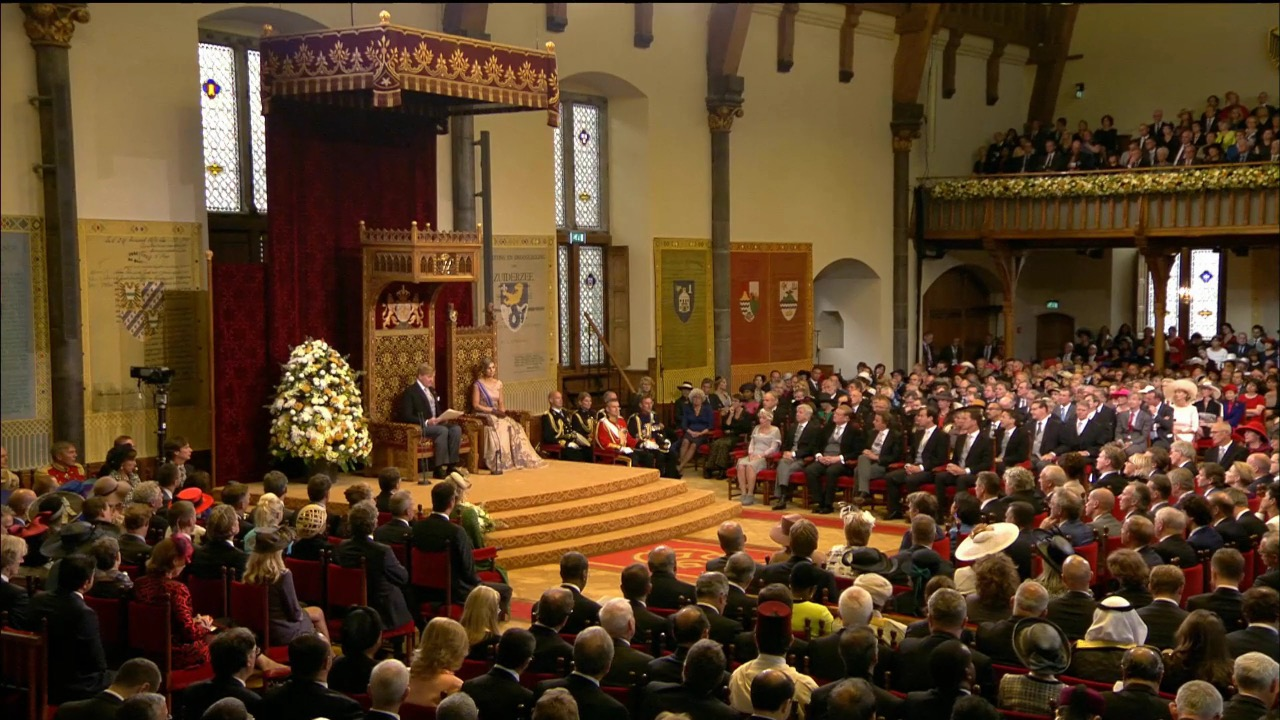
King Willem-Alexander of the Netherlands reading the speech from the throne, 2015

In the Netherlands, the speech from the throne is held annually on the third Tuesday in September, which is called Prinsjesdag (Prince's Day). Article 65 of the constitution states that "A statement of the policy to be pursued by the Government is given by or on behalf of the King before a joint session of the two Houses of the States General that is held every year on the third Tuesday in September or on such earlier date as may be prescribed by Act of Parliament."

The monarch travels from Noordeinde Palace by coach to the Ridderzaal (Hall of Knights) in the Binnenhof of The Hague to read the speech before a joint session of the States General. Following the speech, the president of the joint session calls out 'Long live the King!’ after which the monarch is greeted with three cheers. The monarch and his retinue leave and the joint session is declared to be closed. The monarch returns to the palace in the coach and, along with other members of the royal house, appears on the palace balcony. Following the 1983 revision of the constitution, a parliamentary session changed from lasting a year to lasting for four years. As a result, the speech no longer marks the opening of a session of parliament but the start of a new parliamentary year.

==== Norway ====
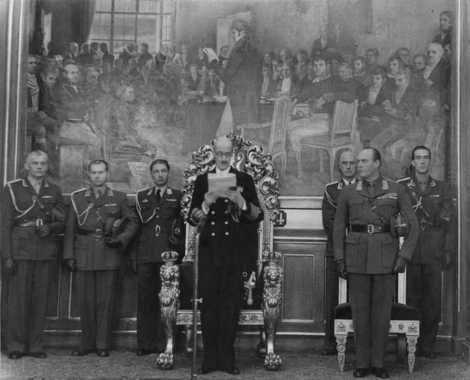
King Haakon VII of Norway delivering the speech from the throne of the Storting, 1950

In Norway, the monarch is required by article 74 of the constitution to preside over the opening of a session of the Storting (which happens every October) after it has been declared to be legally constituted by the president of the Storting. The monarch delivers the speech before parliamentarians in the chamber of the Storting. The heir to the throne also regularly accompanies the monarch.

Upon the monarch's arrival in the chamber, the members of the Storting stand and the first verse of the royal anthem, Kongesangen, is sung. The monarch is handed the speech by the prime minister and proceeds to deliver the speech while all remain standing. Afterwards, the monarch and members take their seats and the Report on the State of the Realm, an account of the government achievement of the past year, is read (traditionally in Nynorsk), customarily by the youngest member of the government present.

The members and monarch rise and the monarch is presented with the report by the prime minister and the monarch returns the speech and report to the president. The president gives some remarks and closes with "May God preserve our King and country", joined by other members of the Storting and the first verse of the national anthem is then sung. After the monarch and his retinue have left, the meeting is adjourned and the speech and report are first debated at the subsequent sitting.

==== Spain ====
In Spain, speeches from the throne used to be practiced before the declaration of the Second Spanish Republic in 1931. With the restoration of the Spanish monarchy in 1975, the monarch still opens parliament but no longer gives a "speech from the throne". The monarch gives a speech but it does not focus on or direct government policy.

==== Sweden ====
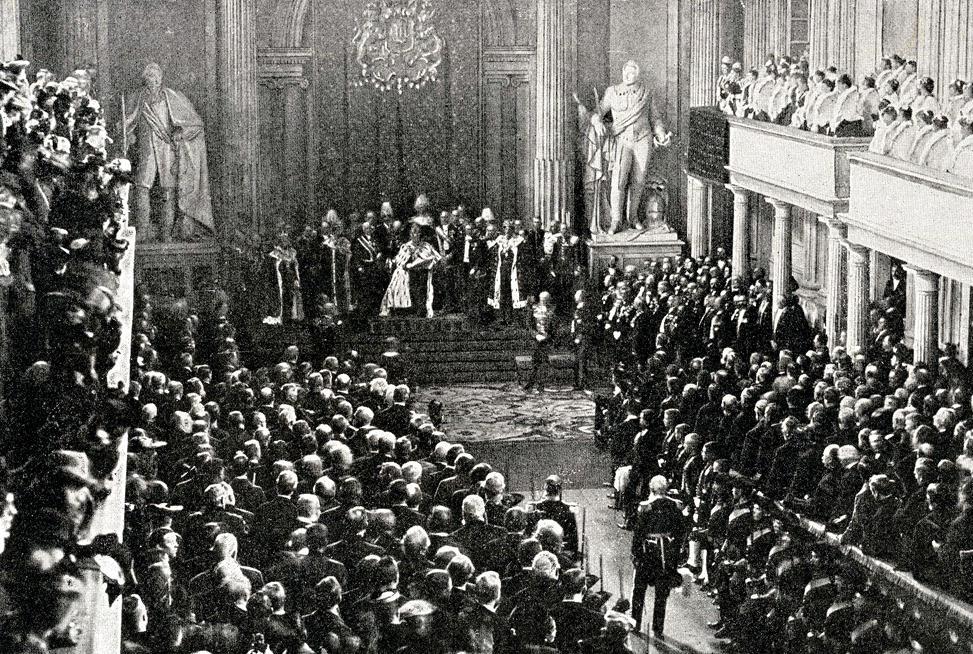
King Oscar II of Sweden and Norway, wearing his crown and ceremonial robes, delivering the speech from the throne, 1898

In Sweden, the practice of having a speech from the throne given by the monarch was held until 1974, coinciding with the rewrite of the constitution of Sweden which removed formal involvement of the monarch in the legislative process. The old opening of the legislature was called "The Solemn Opening of the Riksdag" (Swedish: Riksdagens högtidliga öppnande) and was full of symbolism. The speech was given before the Riksdag in the Hall of State at the Royal Palace. The King would be seated on the Silver Throne as he gave his speech.

Prior to 1907, the monarch and the princes of the royal blood would also wear their royal and princely robes and their crowns and coronets. After Oscar II's death, his successor, Gustav V was not crowned, and thus did not wear the crown when opening the Riksdag. Instead, the crown and sceptre would be placed on cushions beside the throne and the robe would be draped on the throne.

After the abolition of the opening ceremony at the palace, last held in 1974 and only once during the reign of Carl XVI Gustaf, the opening is now held at the Riksdag chamber in the presence of the monarch and his family. It is still the monarch who officially opens the annual session but he no longer gives a "speech from the throne"; the monarch is invited by the Speaker and delivers an introductory speech and then declares the session open. After the speech, the Prime Minister delivers a statement of the upcoming government agenda (Swedish: Regeringsförklaring) for the forthcoming legislative year is made.

==== Thailand ====
In Thailand, the monarch makes a speech at a joint session in the Ananta Samakhom Throne Hall, advising the National Assembly in their work.

=== Republics ===
Many republics also hold a yearly event in which the president gives a speech to a joint session of the legislature, such as the State of the Union address given by the president of the United States and in most U.S. states, where the governor gives a similar State of the State address. Similarly, the president of the Philippines gives the State of the Nation Address. In Hispanophone American countries, this practice is known as mensaje a la nación (message to the nation). Often such are on or near the first day of the legislature's new session. However, in theory, rather than just outline the priorities for the coming year, the head of state is supposed to provide a report to the legislature on what the country's condition is, hence the term State of the Nation.

=== Supranational unions ===
The European Union has an equivalent practice known as the State of the Union, in which the President of the European Commission addresses a plenary session of the European Parliament every September. It is regulated by the 2010 Framework Agreement on relations between the European Parliament and the European Commission.

=== Gallery ===
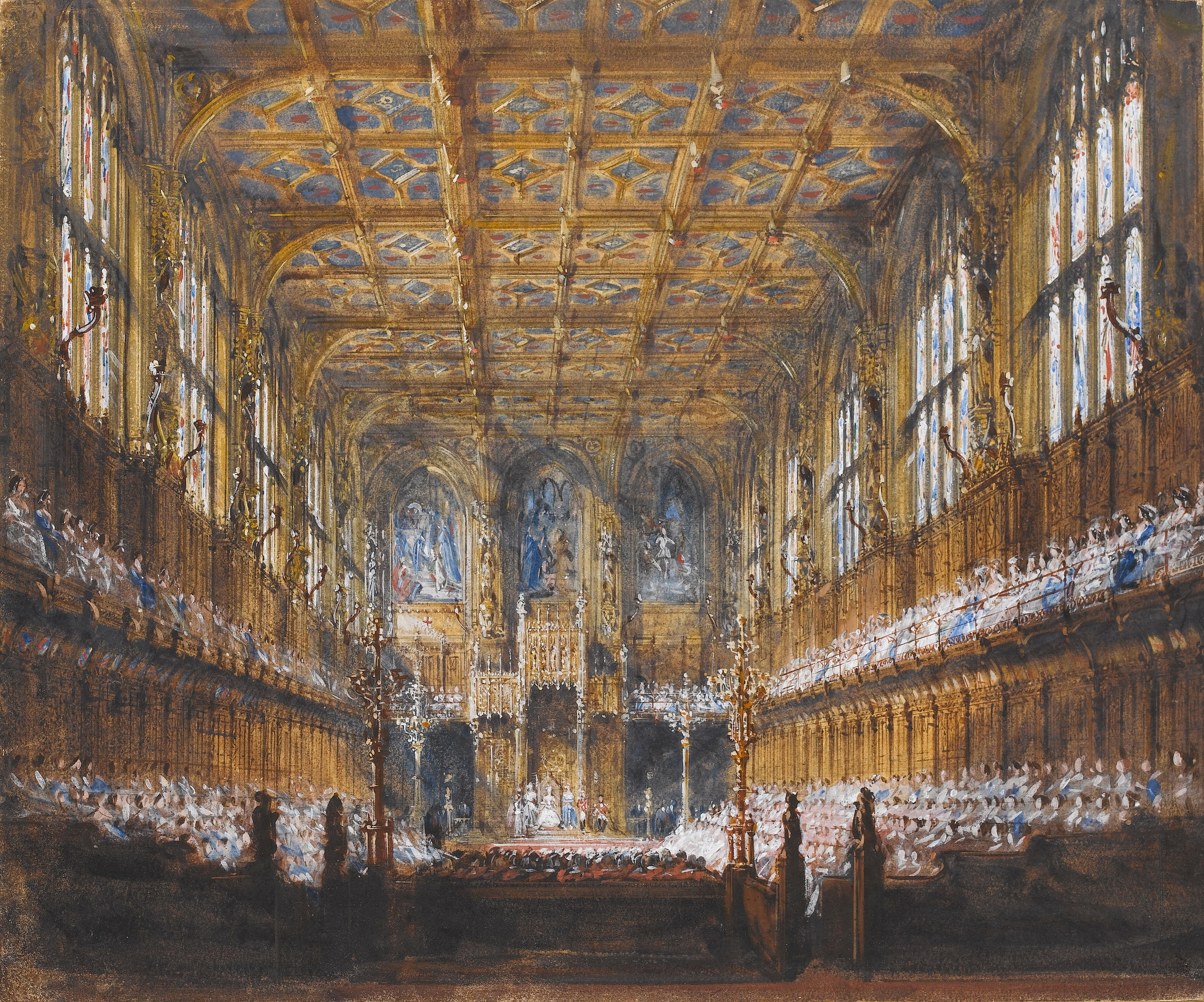
Queen Victoria inaugurates Parliament by the House of Lords (1847).

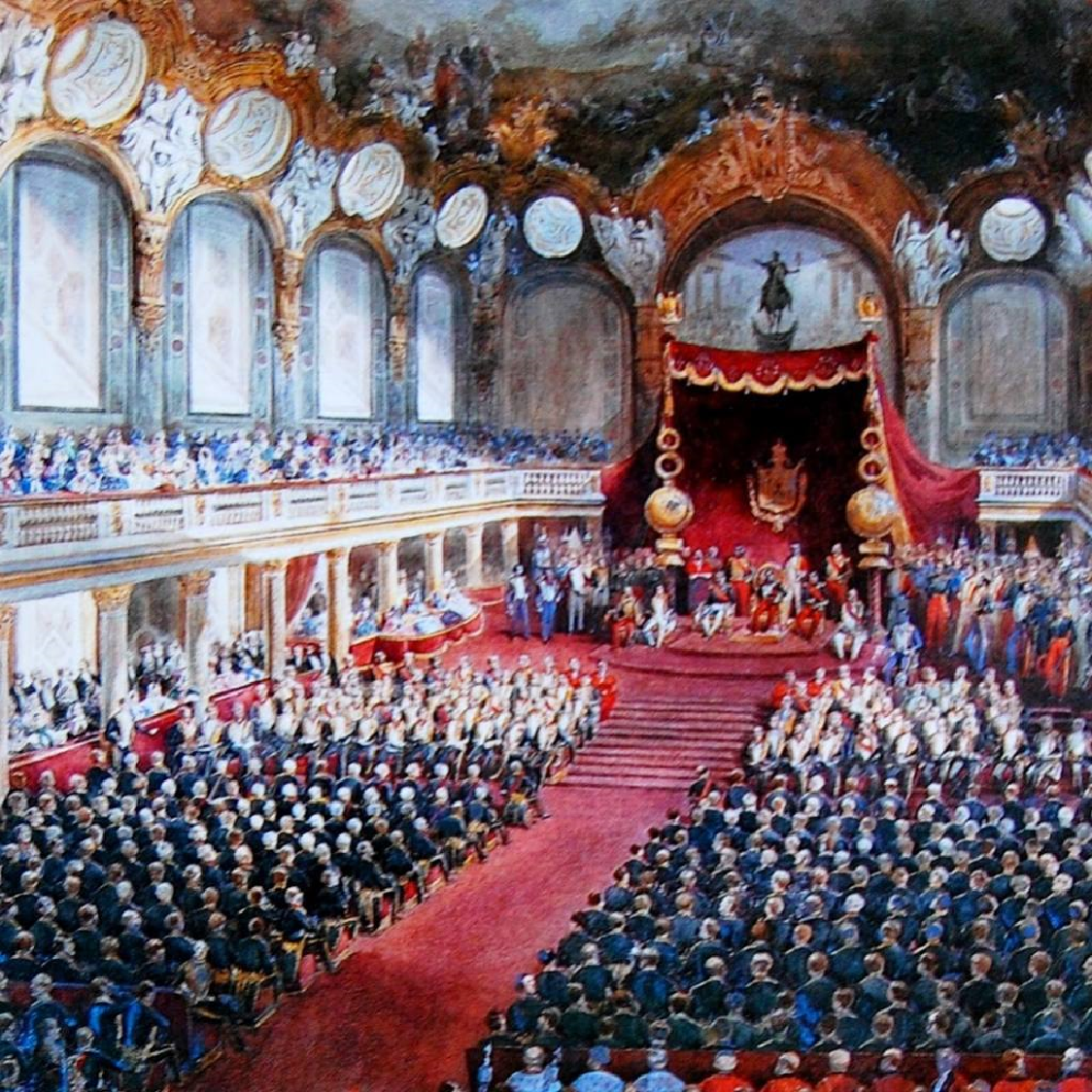
Emperor Napoleon III inaugurates the French Parliament in the "Salle des États" of the Louvre (1859).

King Vittorio Emanuele II inaugurates the First Italian Parliament, at the Madama Place (1861).

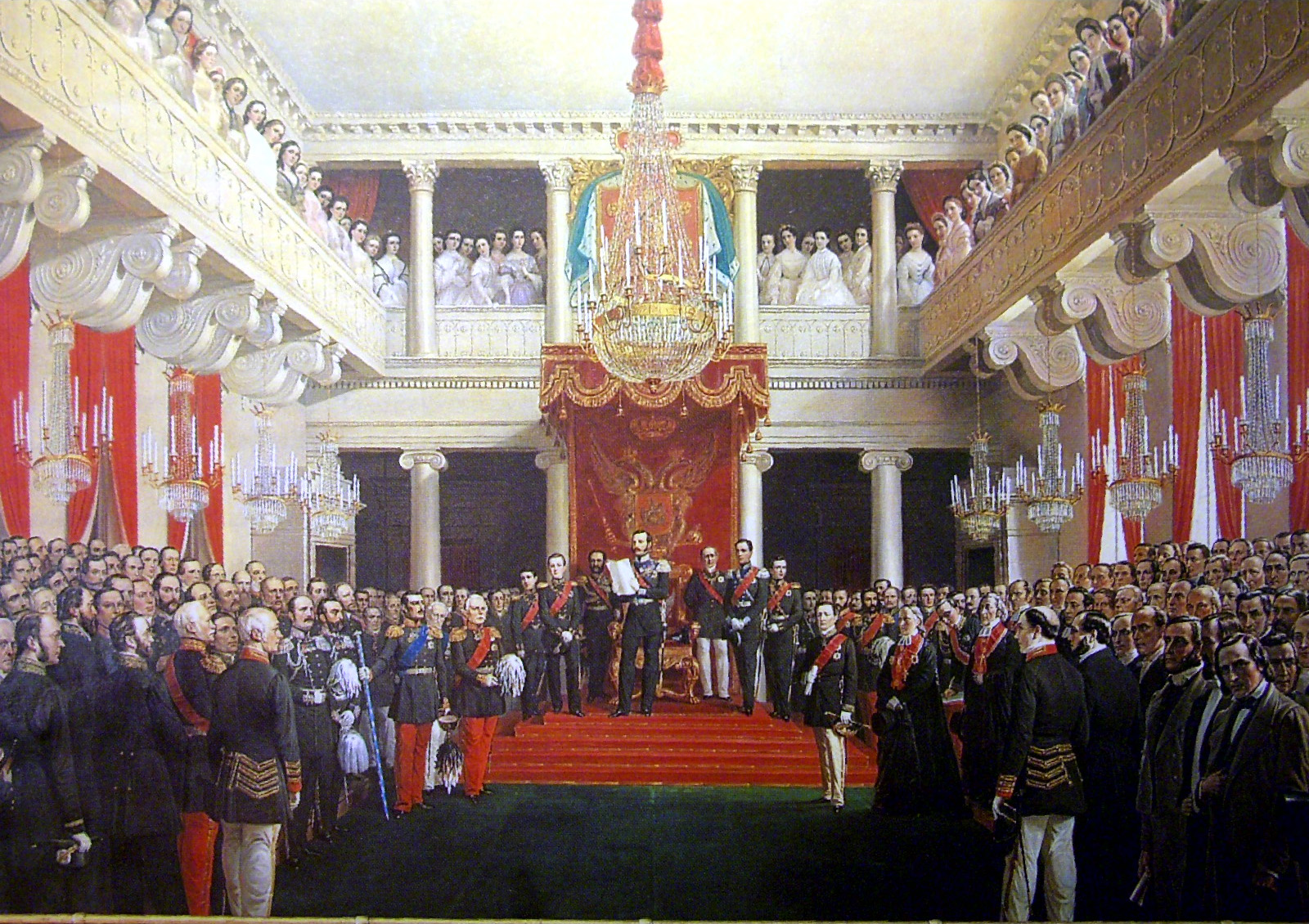
Tsar Alexandre II convenes the Diet of Finland (1863).

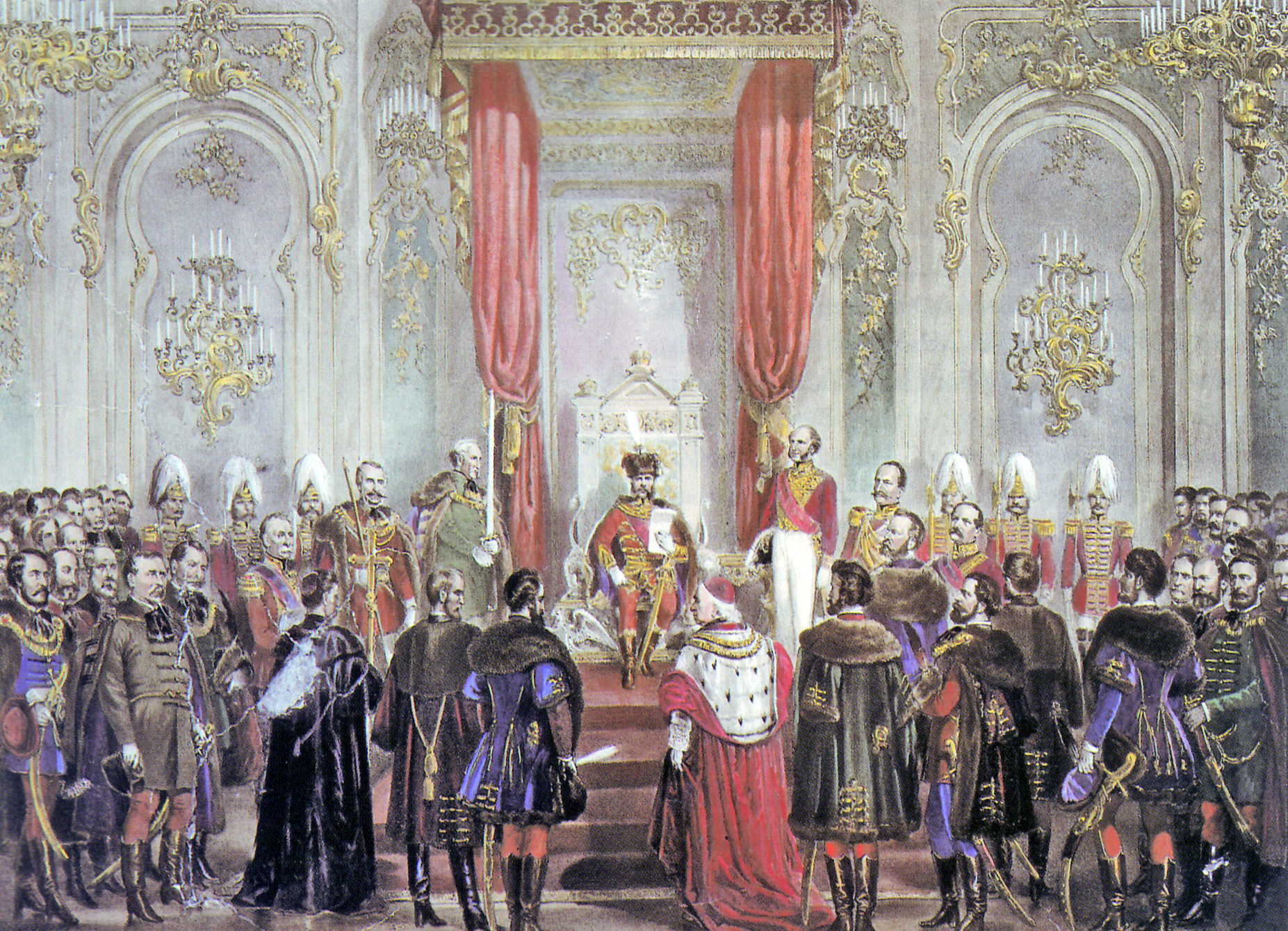
Kaiser Franz Joseph inaugurates the Diet of Hungary at the Royal Castle of Buda (1867).

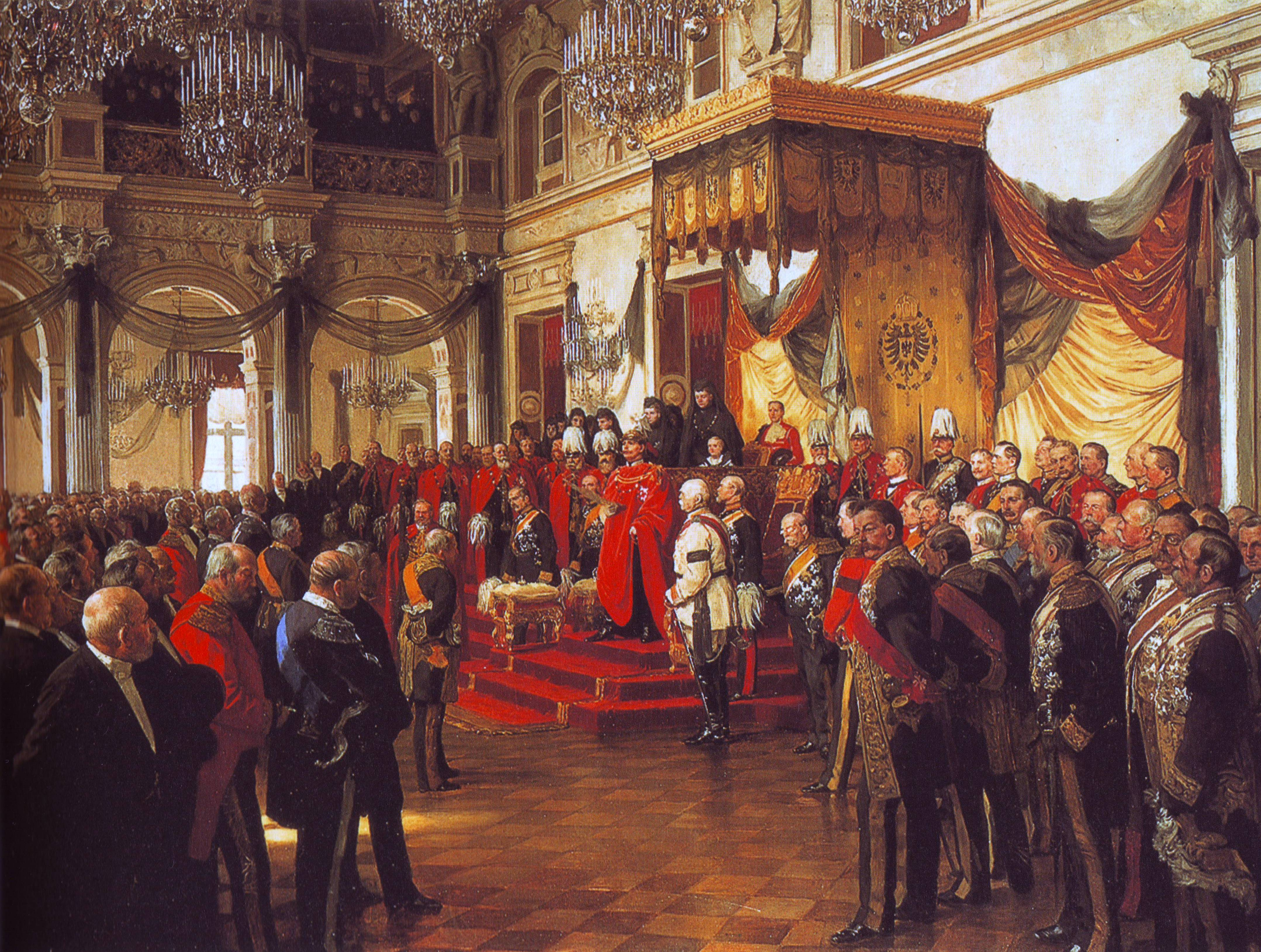
Kaiser Wilhelm II inaugurates the works of the Reichstag in the "Weißer Saal" of the Royal Castle of Berlin (1888).

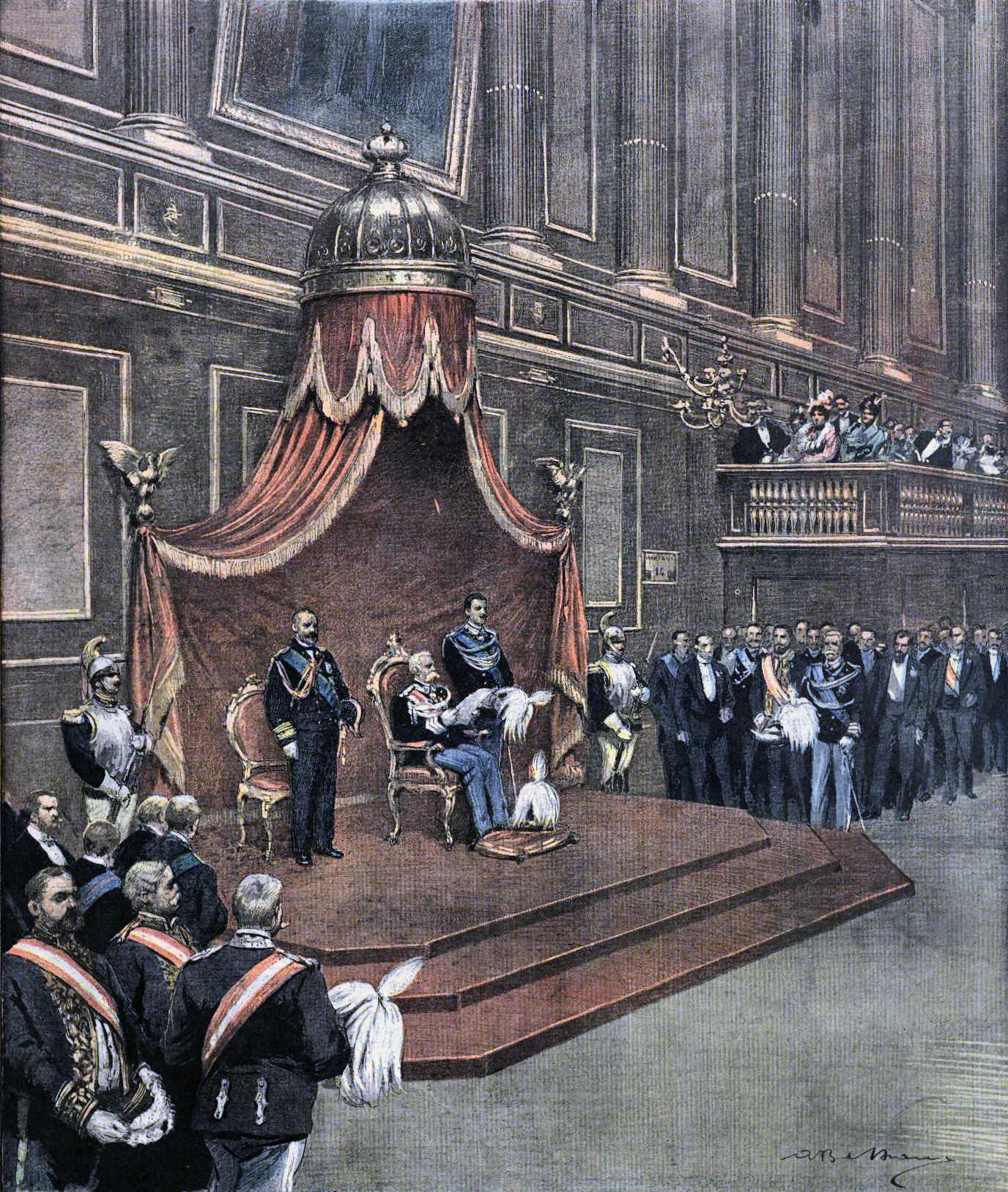
King Umberto I solemnly inaugurates the Italian Parliament (1899).

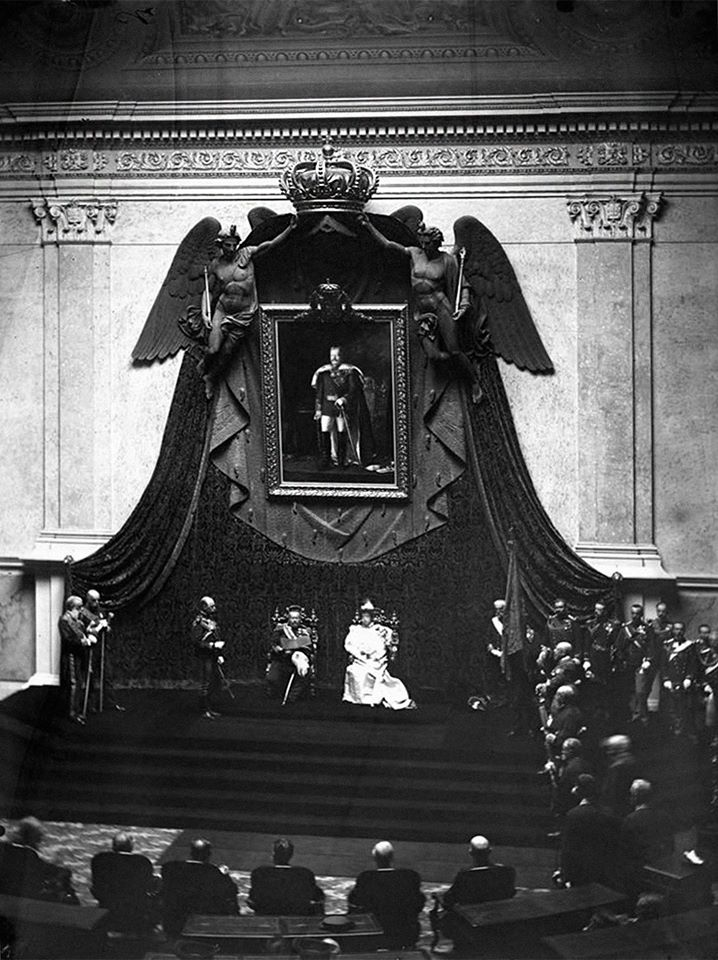
King Charles I inaugurates the Portuguese Parliament (1900).

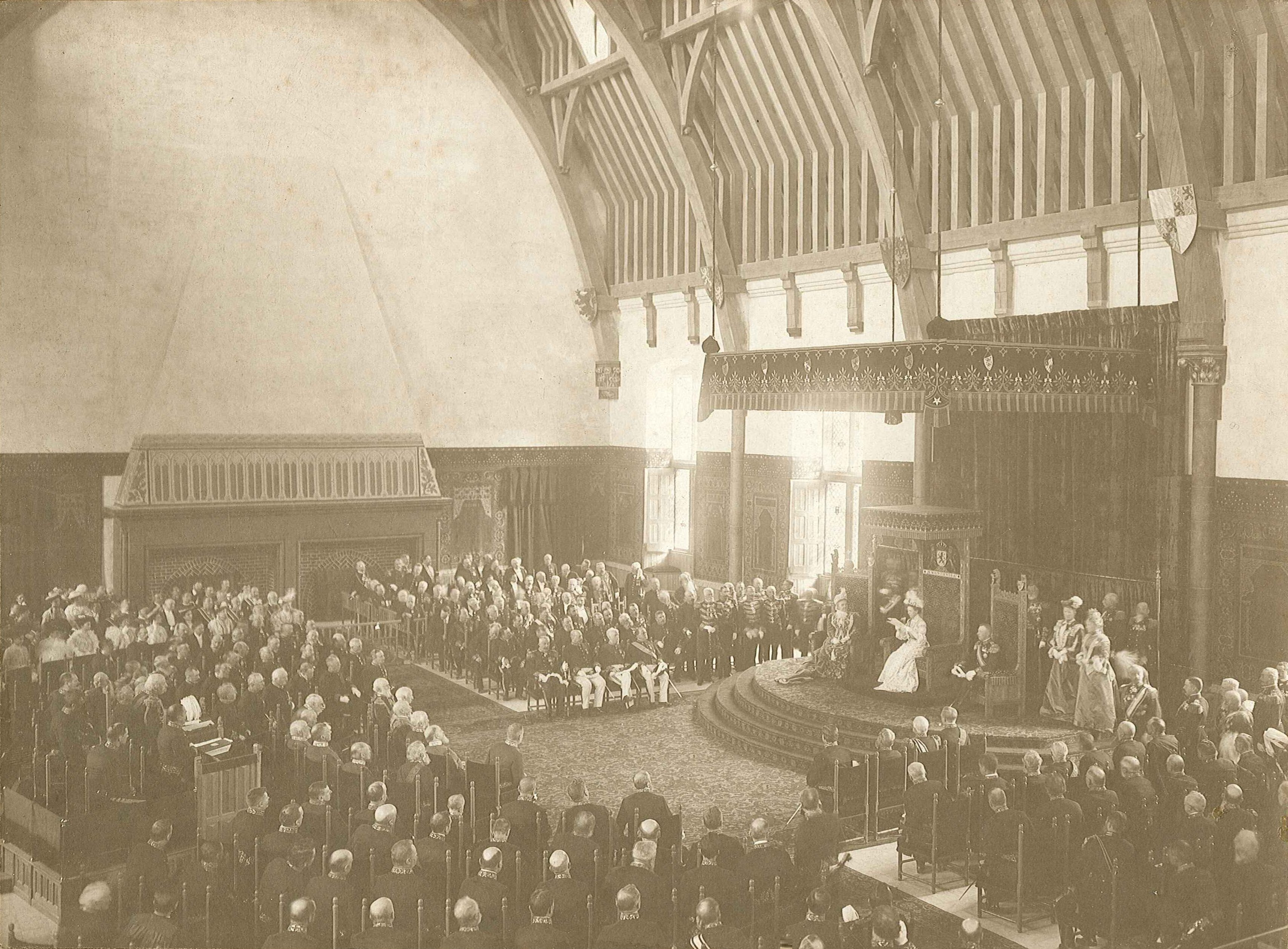
Queen Wilhelmina delivers the speech during the Prinsjesdag (1904).

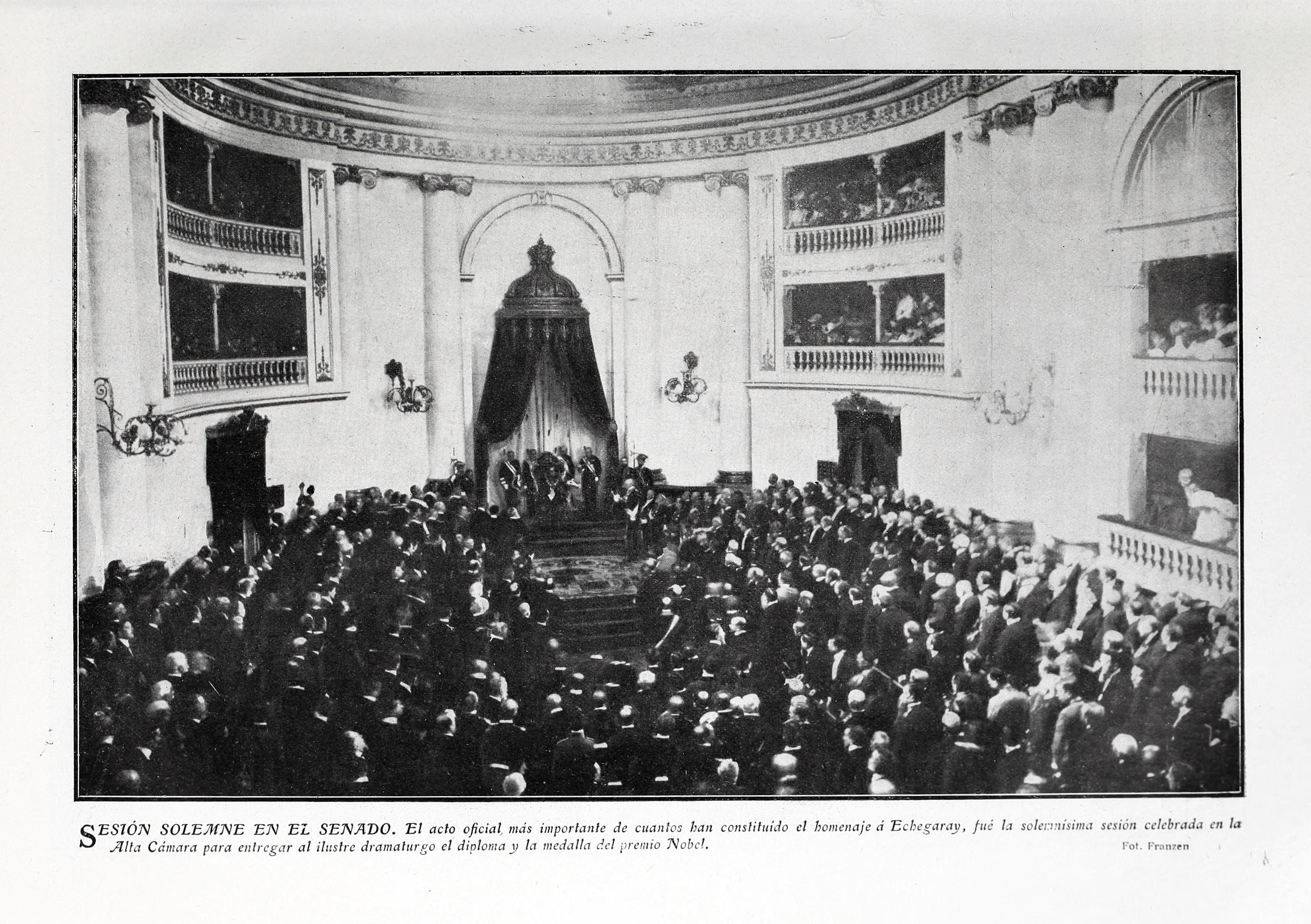
King Alfonso XIII solemnly inaugurates the General Court (1905).

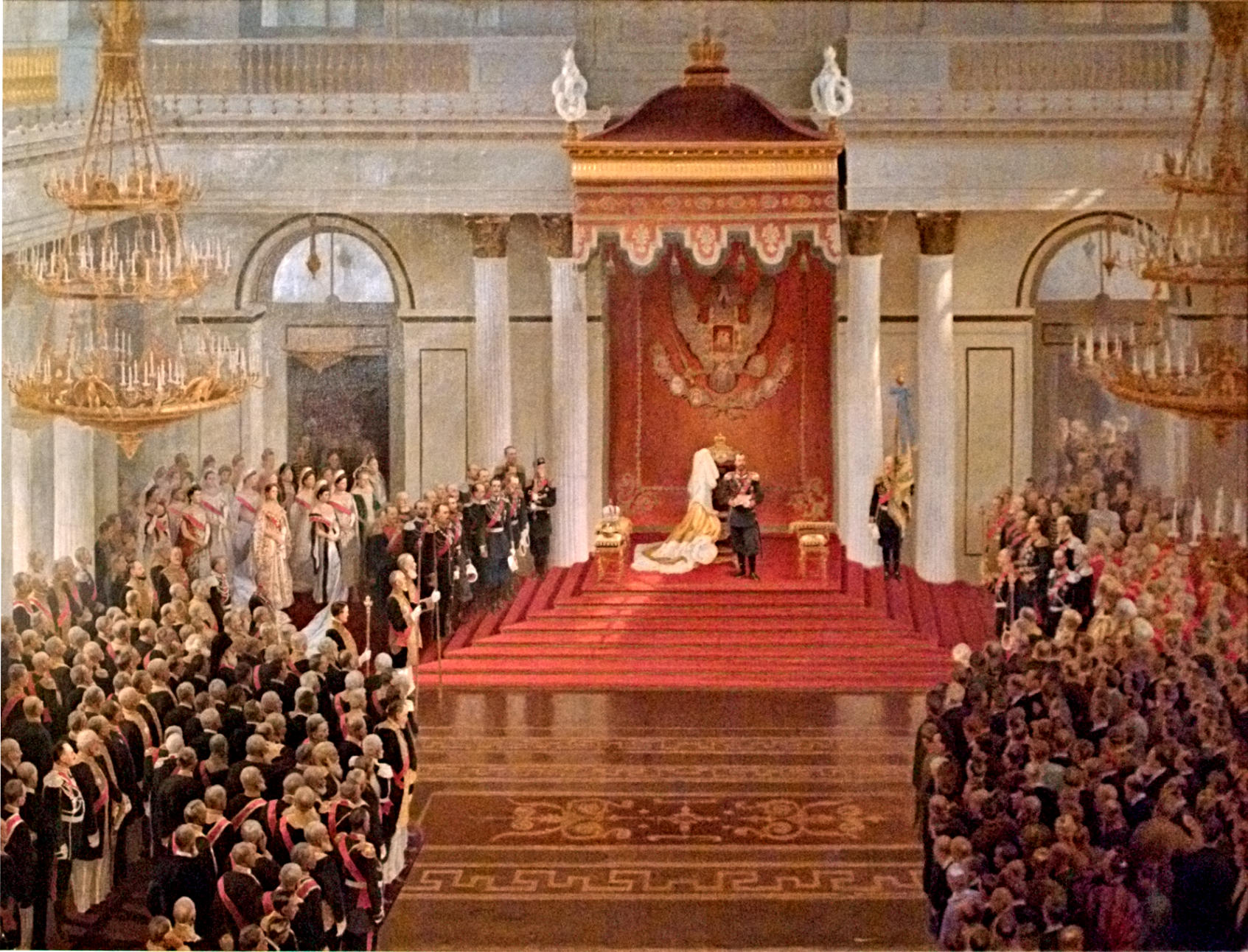
Tsar Nicholas II inaugurates the Imperial Duma for the first time (1906).

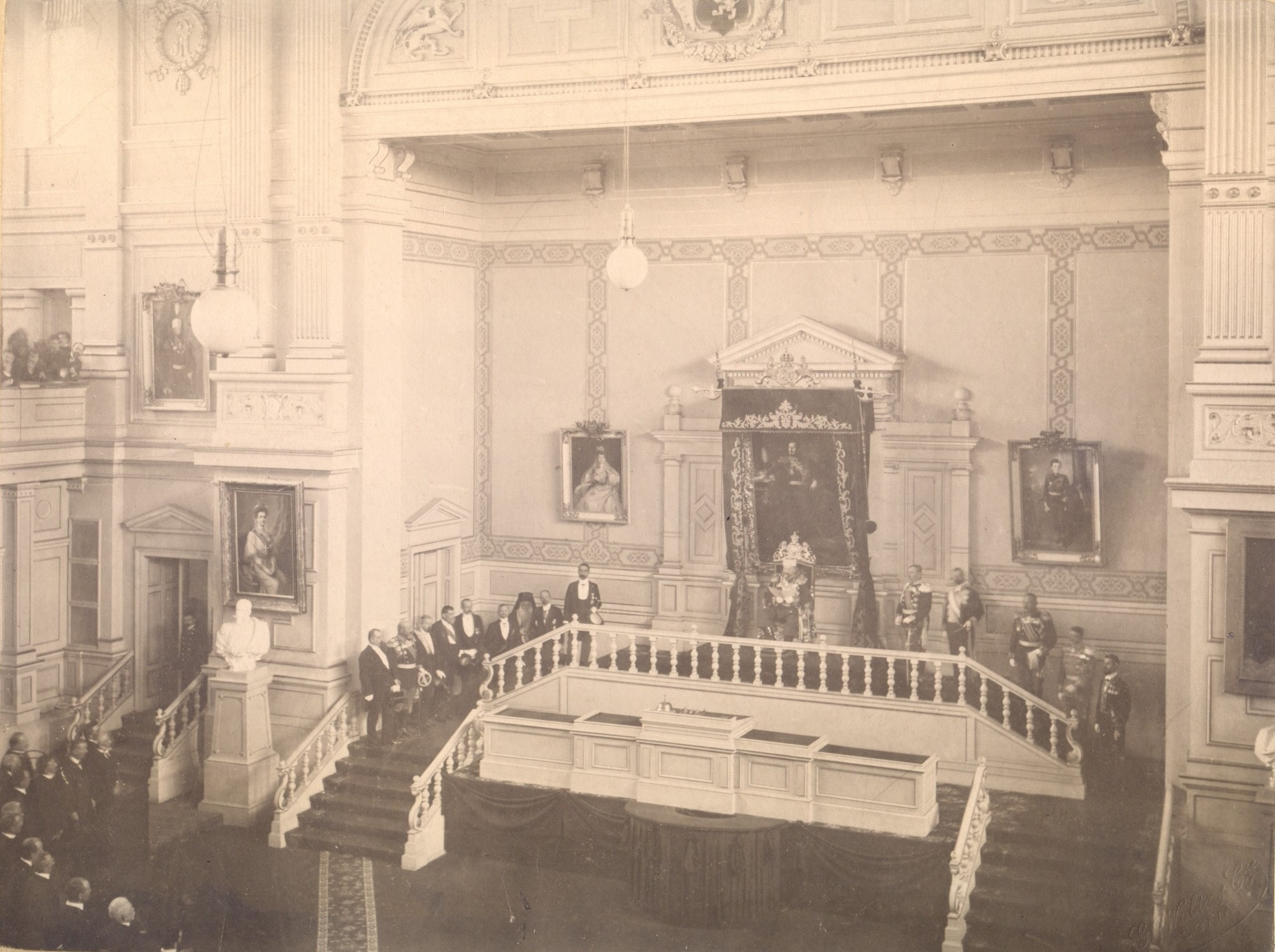
Tsar Ferdinand I solemnly inaugurates the Bulgarian Parliament (1908).

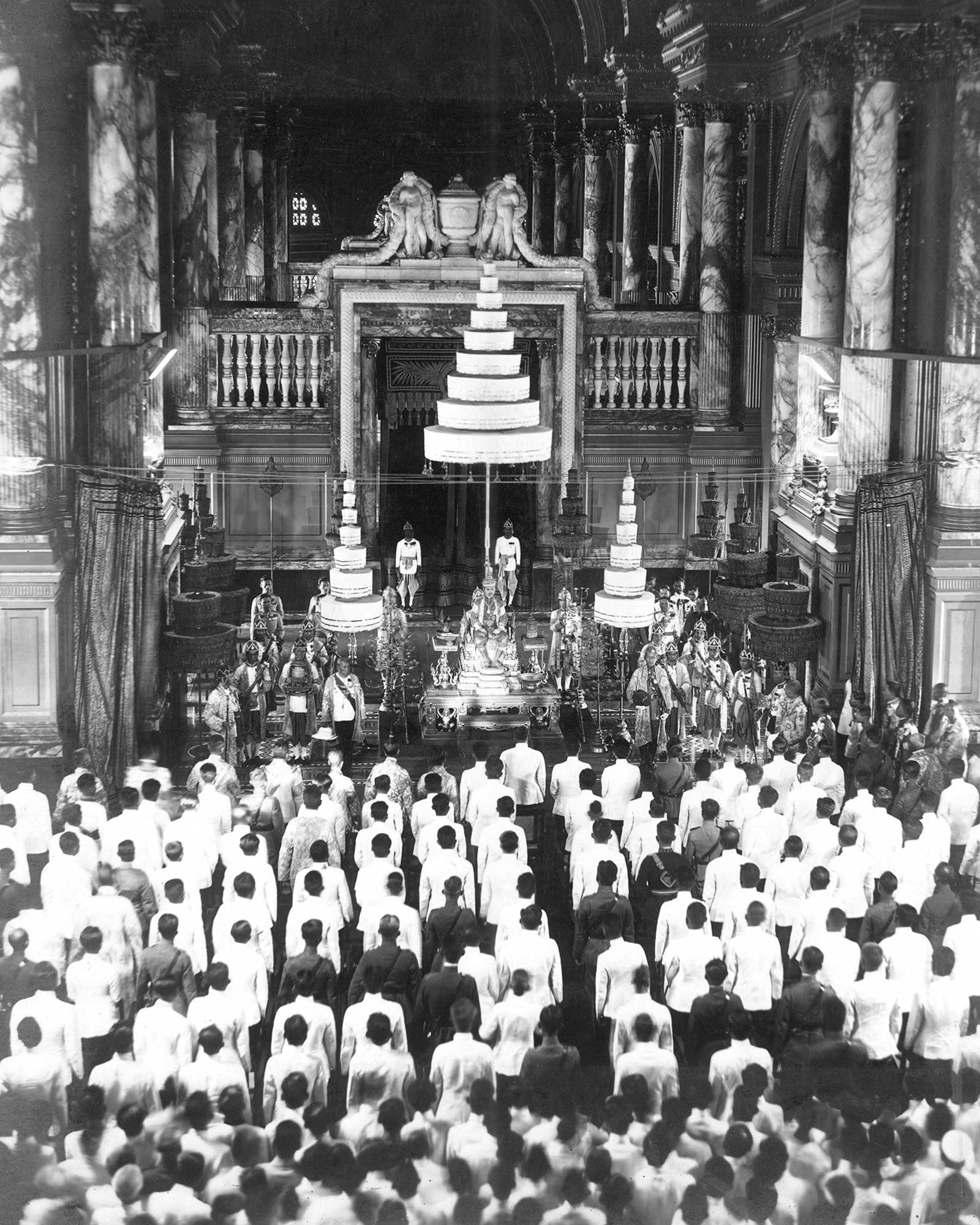
King Rama VII solemnly inaugurates the first Siamese Parliament (1933).

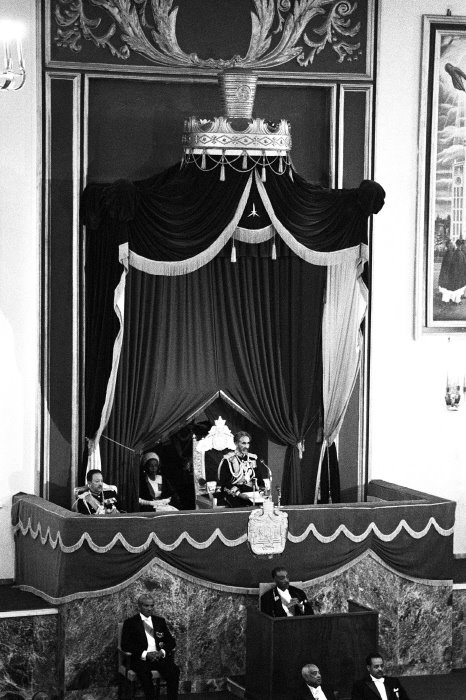
Haile Selassie I inaugurates the Ethiopian parliament (1964).

== See also ==
- Opening of the Canadian parliament
- State of the Nation (disambiguation)
- Royal Christmas message
