= Peter Pyhrr =

American business writer

Peter Pyhrr (born c.1942) is an American business writer. He was a manager at Texas Instruments in Dallas, Texas, who developed the idea of zero-based budgeting (ZBB). He used ZBB successfully at Texas Instruments in the 1960s and authored an influential 1970 article in Harvard Business Review. In 1973, President Jimmy Carter, while governor of Georgia, contracted with Pyhrr to implement a ZBB system for the State of Georgia executive budget process.

Called 'the father of Zero-Based Budgeting', he reportedly "sent an article about the technique to Harvard Business Review and was surprised when they ran it — and even more surprised when he got a call from a staffer for Jimmy Carter, then Democratic governor of Georgia."

Pyhrr was age 27 when he developed ZBB at TI.
