= Commercial invoice =

Document used in foreign trade

When used in foreign trade, a commercial invoice is a customs document. It is used as a customs declaration provided by the person or corporation that is exporting an item across international borders. Although there is no standard format, the document must include a few specific pieces of information such as the parties involved in the shipping transaction, the goods being transported, the country of manufacture, and the Harmonized System codes for those goods. A commercial invoice must often include a statement certifying that the invoice is true, and a signature.

A commercial invoice is used to calculate tariffs, international commercial terms, and is commonly used for customs purposes. Commercial Invoices are generally not needed for shipments between EU Countries—just between EU Countries and non-EU Countries.

Commercial invoices in European countries are not normally for payment. The definitive invoice for payment usually has only the words "invoice". This invoice can also be used as a commercial invoice if additional information is disclosed. Beginning in 2018, European Invoices must be electronic for use in public procurement as laid out in Directive 2014/55/EU.

A sample commercial invoice format

COMMERCIAL INVOICE
| SENDER: AUTO PARTS FEE WAREHOUSE; 7634 KIMBEL STREET UNIT 1-9; MISSISSAUGA, ON L5S-1M6; Phone:905.677.0996; Fax: 999-999-9999; Tax ID/VAT/EIN# nnnnnnnnnn | | | RECIPIENT: XYZ Company; 3 Able End; There, Shropshire, UK; Phone:99-99-9999 | | | |
| Invoice Date: 12 December 2007 | | | Invoice Number: 0256982 | | | |
| Carrier tracking number: 526555598 | | | Sender's Reference: 5555555 | | | |
| Carrier: GHI Transport Company | | | Recipient's Reference: 5555555 | | | |
| Quantity | Country of Origin | Description of Contents | Harmonized Code | Unit Weight | Unit Value | Subtotal (USD) |
| 1,000 | United States of America | Widgets | 999999 | 2 | 10.00 | 10,000 |
| Total Net Weight (lbs): | 2,000 | Total Declared Value (USD): | 10,000 | | | |
| Total Gross Weight (lbs): | 2,050 | Freight and Insurance Charges (USD): | 300.00 | | | |
| Total Shipment Pieces: | 1,000 | Other Charges (USD): | 30.00 | | | |
| Currency Code: | USD | Total Invoice Amount (USD): | 10,330 | | | |
| Type of Export: Permanent | | | Terms of Trade: Delivery Duty Unpaid | | | |
Reason for Export: stated reason
General Notes: notes and comments
The exporter of the products covered by this document - customs authorization number - declares that, except where otherwise clearly indicated, these products are of United States Of America preferential origin. I/We hereby certify that the information on this invoice is true and correct and that the contents of this shipment are as stated above. Name, Position in exporting company, company stamp, signature

== See also ==
- Recommendation No. 06: Aligned Invoice Layout Key for International Trade (UN/CEFACT; 2000; 7 pages) ID: ECE/TRADE/148; Topic: Trade Facilitation and e-Business
