= Outlawries Bill =

Customary bill introduced after the State Opening of the UK Parliament

A Bill for the more effectual preventing clandestine Outlawries, usually referred to as the Outlawries Bill, is customarily the first bill on the agenda of the United Kingdom's House of Commons at the start of each session of Parliament. It is used symbolically to signal the Commons' right to consider matters not contained in the speech from the throne (known as a King’s or Queen’s speech) given by the Monarch.

== Ceremonial purpose ==
The bill is introduced after the King's Speech, after the Commons have returned to their chamber, but before any debate on the contents of the speech. No Member of Parliament presents it, nor has it been ordered to be printed in recent times. It is not intended to make any further progress, but rather bears a symbolic import: by not discussing the contents of the King's Speech immediately, the House of Commons are demonstrating that they can debate on whatever they choose and have the right to set their own business regardless of the Monarch.

The practice of giving a first reading to a bill before debating the Speech dates back to at least 1558; the purpose of this practice was first explained in a 1604 bill. Various bills were used for the purpose; originally they were just normal bills and could progress to a second reading. The Outlawries Bill was first introduced in the 1727 session and has been used at the start of every session thereafter (except for 1741 and 1742).

John Wilkes interrupted the reading of the bill in 1763, to complain about his imprisonment, but the Speaker required the Commons to first deal with the bill. In 1794 Richard Brinsley Sheridan used the reading of the bill to raise the subject of the suspension of the Habeas Corpus Act.

The usefulness of the bill was last considered in 2002. The Procedure Committee investigated the history of the bill and determined that because it has symbolic meaning and takes very little time to announce, there is no need to abandon it.

=== Other legislatures ===
The equivalent bill used by the House of Lords is the Select Vestries Bill.

In Canada, similar pro forma bills are introduced in both houses of Parliament, numbered bills C-1 and S-1. They are traditionally entitled An Act respecting the Administration of Oaths of Office in the House of Commons and An Act relating to Railways in the Senate, although the text of neither bill makes any mention of oaths of office or railways.

In the Australian House of Representatives, a new bill is drafted for this purpose each time (in the 46th Parliament this was the Agriculture Legislation Repeal Bill 2019) and is presented by the Prime Minister. Unlike the Canadian equivalent, the bills' contents do address the respective subject matters and could theoretically be enacted like any other bill. However, a second reading is never moved. A pro forma bill is not used in the Australian Senate; instead, other formal business, such as question time, ministerial statements and/or other bills, is transacted before consideration of the governor-general's speech.

The Parliament of Northern Ireland (in existence 1921–1972) also gave a first reading to the Outlawries Bill after the Speech from the Throne (delivered by the Governor of Northern Ireland, except in 1921 when King George V appeared in person).

== Background ==
The term outlawry referred to the formal procedure of declaring someone an outlaw, i.e. putting him outside of the sphere of legal protection. In the common law of England, a judgment of (criminal) outlawry was one of the harshest penalties in the legal system, since the outlaw could not use the legal system to protect them if needed, e.g. from mob justice. To be declared an outlaw was to suffer a form of civil death. No one was allowed to give food, shelter, or any other sort of support – to do so was to commit the crime of aiding and abetting, and to be in danger of the ban oneself. In effect, (criminal) outlaws were criminals on the run who were "wanted dead or alive".

By the rules of common law, a criminal outlaw did not need to be guilty of the crime they were outlawed for. If accused of a crime and, instead of appearing in court and defending oneself from accusations, fled from justice, they were committing serious contempt of court, which was itself a capital crime; so even if innocent of the crime originally accused, they were guilty of evading justice (see also: bench warrant).

There was also civil outlawry. Civil outlawry did not carry capital punishment with it, and it was imposed on defendants who fled or evaded justice when sued for civil actions such as debts or torts. The punishments for civil outlawry were nevertheless harsh, including confiscation of chattels (movable property) left behind by the outlaw.

In the civil context, outlawry became obsolescent in civil procedure by reforms that no longer required summoned defendants to appear and plead. Still, the possibility of being declared an outlaw for derelictions of civil duty continued to exist in English law until 1879 and in Scots law until the late 1940s. Since then, failure to find the defendant and serve process is usually interpreted in favour of the plaintiff (see: default judgment), and harsh penalties for mere nonappearance (merely presumed flight to escape justice) no longer apply.

== Content ==
Since the bill is now neither printed nor debated, its exact text is unclear. The following outlawry bill, as introduced during the reign of Queen Victoria, may serve as an illustration for such a bill's form; Parliament's website states that "the text has remained the same since Victorian times". Missing details such as dates or penalties are indicated in brackets.

A Bill for the more effectual preventing clandestine Outlawries.

For the more effectual preventing Clandestine Outlawries in Personal Actions, Be it Enacted by the Queen's most excellent Majesty by and with the advice and consent of the Lords Spiritual and Temporal and Commons in this present Parliament assembled and by the authority of the same.

That if after the [date] any attorney Solicitor or other person who shall prosecute any person or persons to Outlawry in any action personal wherein no Writ or Exegerit shall be awarded shall make default to send or deliver the Writ of Proclamation to the Sheriff of the proper County where the Defendant shall be dwelling at the time of awarding the Exegerit (the place of such dwelling being known), every such Attorney Solicitor or other person aforesaid making such default being lawfully convicted shall for every such offence forfeit [amount]; and if the Sheriff (the Writ of Proclamation being duly delivered to him) shall refuse or neglect before the Return of the Writ to make [number of] Proclamations according to the directions of the Act made in the thirty-first year of the reign of Queen Elizabeth for the avoiding of privy and secret Outlawries in actions personal, every such Sheriff being lawfully convicted shall for every such refusal or neglect forfeit [amount].

When a defendant in civil or criminal cases could not be found, the reason would not always be clear. A person might depart for perfectly innocent reasons and be completely unaware that a criminal accusation or civil suit might be brought against them after departure. The English common law, however, established a rule that if a defendant could not be found (or did not show up for court) after a certain waiting period and proper public advertisements, they could be assumed to have fled or hid to escape justice, and subjected to the appropriate punishments for contempt of court.

A "clandestine outlawry" would be a judgment of outlawry passed against a defendant without giving the legal action proper publicity and the defendant adequate opportunity to be notified and answer the charges (see also: sewer service). The Outlawries Bill contemplates two manners in which this might happen.

The first possibility considers that litigants – whether attorneys, solicitors or any other persons – might know the county where the defendant is dwelling, but nevertheless fail to send or deliver the Writ of Proclamation to the sheriff of the proper county. In other words, they might sue a defendant in a remote place and, knowing where the defendant lives, fail to contact the defendant by official channels.

The second possibility refers to a previous Act of Outlawry describing the proper proclamations to be made to seek a legal defendant, and considers that a sheriff might neglect or refuse to make such proclamations, and nevertheless report (returning the writ) that the person was not found (and therefore presumed to be escaping justice).

The text of the Outlawries Bill provides penalties for both kinds of malefactors (sheriffs and plaintiffs), leaving blanks for the actual penalties, to be decided during further discussion of the bill.

Before the Outlawries Bill became a symbolic custom, several Outlawry Acts were passed into English law: the Outlawry Act 1331 (5 Edw. 3. cc. 12 & 13), in 1363 (37 Edw. 3), in 1406 (7 Hen. 4), in 1532 (23 Hen. 8. c. 14), and the Avoidance of Secret Outlawries Act 1588 (31 Eliz. 1. c. 3), none of which appears to be still in force.

== See also ==
- Select Vestries Bill in the House of Lords
- Bills C-1 and S-1, equivalent in Canadian Parliament
