= Select Vestries Bill =

Customary bill in the United Kingdom

A bill for the better regulating of Select Vestries, usually referred to as the Select Vestries Bill, is customarily the first bill introduced and debated in the United Kingdom's House of Lords at the start of each session of Parliament. The equivalent bill used by the House of Commons is the Outlawries Bill.

The bill is read after the King's Speech, after the Commons have returned to their chamber, but before any debate on the contents of the Speech. The bill is given a pro forma first reading upon the motion of the Leader of the House of Lords, to demonstrate that the House can debate on whatever it chooses and set its own business independently of the Crown.

== Origin of the bill ==
The vestry committees evolved in ecclesiastical parishes out of the feudal system and the removal of the influence of the Church after the Reformation. They had a dual nature and acquired civil duties such as administering the Poor Law. These bodies met in the vestry of the local parish church and were responsible for imposing a form of local taxes known as the church rate. They were in effect the government of rural England and Wales until the reforms of the late 19th century creating county, district, and parish councils.

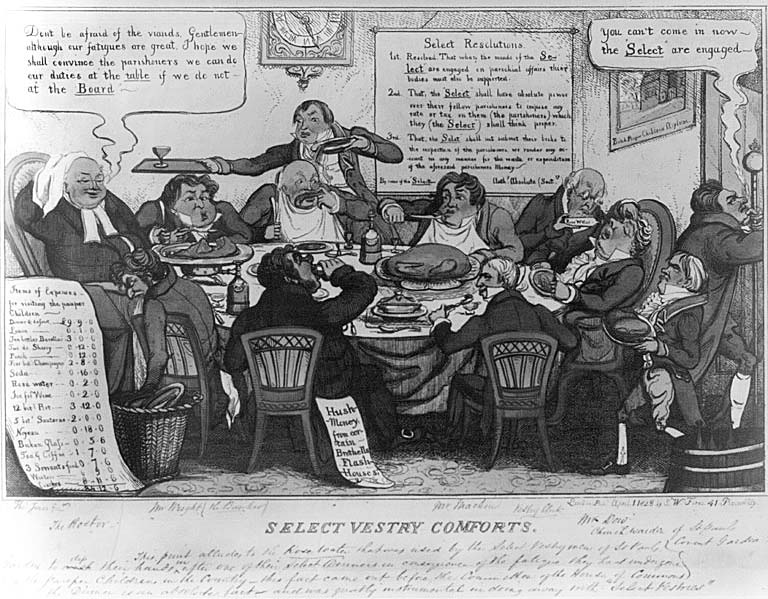
Satirical cartoon of the select vestry of St. Paul's, Covent Garden. Thomas Jones 1828

Whilst the open vestry was a general meeting of all inhabitant rate-paying householders in a parish, in the 17th century the huge growth of population in some parishes, mostly urban, made it increasingly difficult to convene and conduct meetings. Consequently, select vestries were created in some of these. They were administrative committees of selected parishioners whose members generally had a property qualification and who were recruited largely by co-option. This took responsibility from the community at large and improved efficiency, but over time tended to lead to governance by a self-perpetuating elite. This committee was also known as the "close vestry".

By the late 17th century, the existence of a number of autocratic and corrupt select vestries had become a national scandal, and several bills were introduced to Parliament in the 1690s, but none became acts. There was continual agitation for reform, and in 1698 to keep the debate alive the House of Lords insisted that a bill to reform the select vestries, the Select Vestries Bill, would always be the first item of business of the Lords in a new parliament until a reform bill was passed. The first reading of the bill was made annually, but every year the bill never got any further. This continues to this day as an archaic custom in the Lords to assert the independence from the Crown, even though the select vestries have long been abolished.

== Select Vestries Acts ==
Select Vestries Act 1663
- Act of Parliament
- Parliament of England
- Long title: An Act for regulating Select Vestryes.
- Citation: 15 Cha. 2. c. 5
- Territorial extent: England and Wales

Dates
- Royal assent: 27 July 1663
- Commencement: 18 February 1663 (Note: Start of session.)
- Repealed: 28 July 1863
Other legislation
Repealed by	Statute Law Revision Act 1863

Status: Repealed

Text of statute as originally enacted

Vestries Act 1818 (Note: The citation of this act by this short title was authorised by section 1 of, and the first schedule to, the Short Titles Act 1896. Due to the repeal of those provisions it is now authorised by section 19(2) of the Interpretation Act 1978.)
- Act of Parliament
- Parliament of the United Kingdom
- Long title: An Act for the Regulation of Parish Vestries.
- Citation: 58 Geo. 3. c. 69
- Territorial extent: England and Wales (Note: Section 11.)

Dates
- Royal assent: 3 June 1818
- Commencement: 3 June 1818 (Note: The Acts of Parliament (Commencement) Act 1793.)
- Repealed: 1 June 1992
Other legislation
Amended by	Statute Law Revision Act 1873; Local Government Act 1894; Local Government Act 1933; London Government Act 1939
Repealed by	Church of England (Miscellaneous Provisions) Measure 1992

Status: Repealed

Text of statute as originally enacted

Revised text of statute as amended

Poor Relief Act 1819
- Act of Parliament
- Parliament of the United Kingdom
- Long title: An Act to Amend the Law for the Relief of the Poor.
- Citation: 59 Geo. 3. c. 12
- Territorial extent: England and Wales (Note: Section 38.)

Dates
- Royal assent: 31 March 1819
- Commencement: 31 March 1819
- Repealed: 1 June 1992
Other legislation
Repealed by	Church of England (Miscellaneous Provisions) Measure 1992

Status: Repealed

Text of statute as originally enacted

The term Select Vestries Acts collectively refers to two Acts of Parliament passed in 1818 and 1819 respectively, the Vestries Act 1818 (58 Geo. 3. c. 69), and the Poor Relief Act 1819 (59 Geo. 3. c. 12). These acts were promoted by William Sturges Bourne, MP and Chairman of a Committee to reform the Poor Laws, and are therefore also known as the Sturges Bourne Acts.
