= List of accounting roles =

Many accountants in the United States are not certified, particularly those who work in corporate America. They may be referred to as bookkeepers, accountants, junior accountants, staff accountants, senior accountants, or accounting supervisors, depending on their level in the management duties and their position in the corporate hierarchy. An accountant is a generic term which can refer to any of the below classifications.

== Controller ==
In a corporate environment, a controller supervises all other accounting staff and usually reports to a chief financial officer or director of finance.

== Accounting Manager ==
A mid to upper-level manager and accounting professional who oversees staff accountants and/or accounting supervisors or junior accountants. They may or may not be a CPA, but are almost always required to have a bachelor's degree.

== Accounting Supervisor ==
An upper-level accounting professional who directly oversees one or more accounting specialists. Similar to an accounting manager, they are usually subordinate to the manager, or report directly to the controller or CFO. In addition to their supervisory role, they will be responsible for monitoring and approving the financial processes and reporting of their department.

== Senior Accountant ==
An upper-level accounting professional who usually reports directly to a controller or assistant controller or, in the public accounting world, one of the partners. They will almost always have a bachelor's degree, and sometimes a master's. They may even have their CPA, or be a CPA candidate. In addition to general accounting duties, they help company's management to analyze the economic health of the organization, usually through timely financial reports and counsel. They may or may not have supervisory responsibilities over junior accountants and/or clerical personnel.

== Staff Accountant ==
A mid-level accounting position between junior accountant and senior accountant. At public accounting firms, staff accountant may be an entry-level position. Staff accountants typically have bachelor degrees but are not necessarily Certified Public Accountants. Typical duties of a staff accountant include preparing journal entries and reconciliations. Staff accountants may also perform duties such as accounts payable and accounts receivable. A corporate staff accountant typically reports to a controller or accounting manager.

== Junior Accountant ==
An entry-level accounting position, usually reporting to any of the higher level accounting positions, or in smaller companies, to the controller. They may or may not have a bachelor's degree, and their main responsibilities will usually include reconciling accounts and preparing preliminary reports.

== Bookkeeper ==
Bookkeeping is the recording of financial transactions, and is part of the process of accounting in business and other organizations. It involves preparing source documents for all transactions, operations, and other events of a business. Transactions include purchases, sales, receipts and payments by an individual person, organization or corporation. There are several standard methods of bookkeeping, including the single-entry and double-entry bookkeeping systems. While these may be viewed as "real" bookkeeping, any process for recording financial transactions is a bookkeeping process.
