= Letter of transmittal =

In economics, a letter of transmittal is a type of cover letter that accompanies a document, such as a financial report or security certificate.

It is a business letter and is formatted accordingly. It should include the recipient's address, the sender's address, distribution list, a salutation and closing. It typically includes why it should receive the reader's consideration, and what the reader should do with it. The transmittal letter provides the recipient with a specific context in which to place the larger document or certificate and simultaneously gives the sender a permanent record of having sent the material.

In the financial field it is used by security holders to accompany certificates surrendered in an exchange or corporate action.
