= Solemn Opening of the Parliament of Spain =

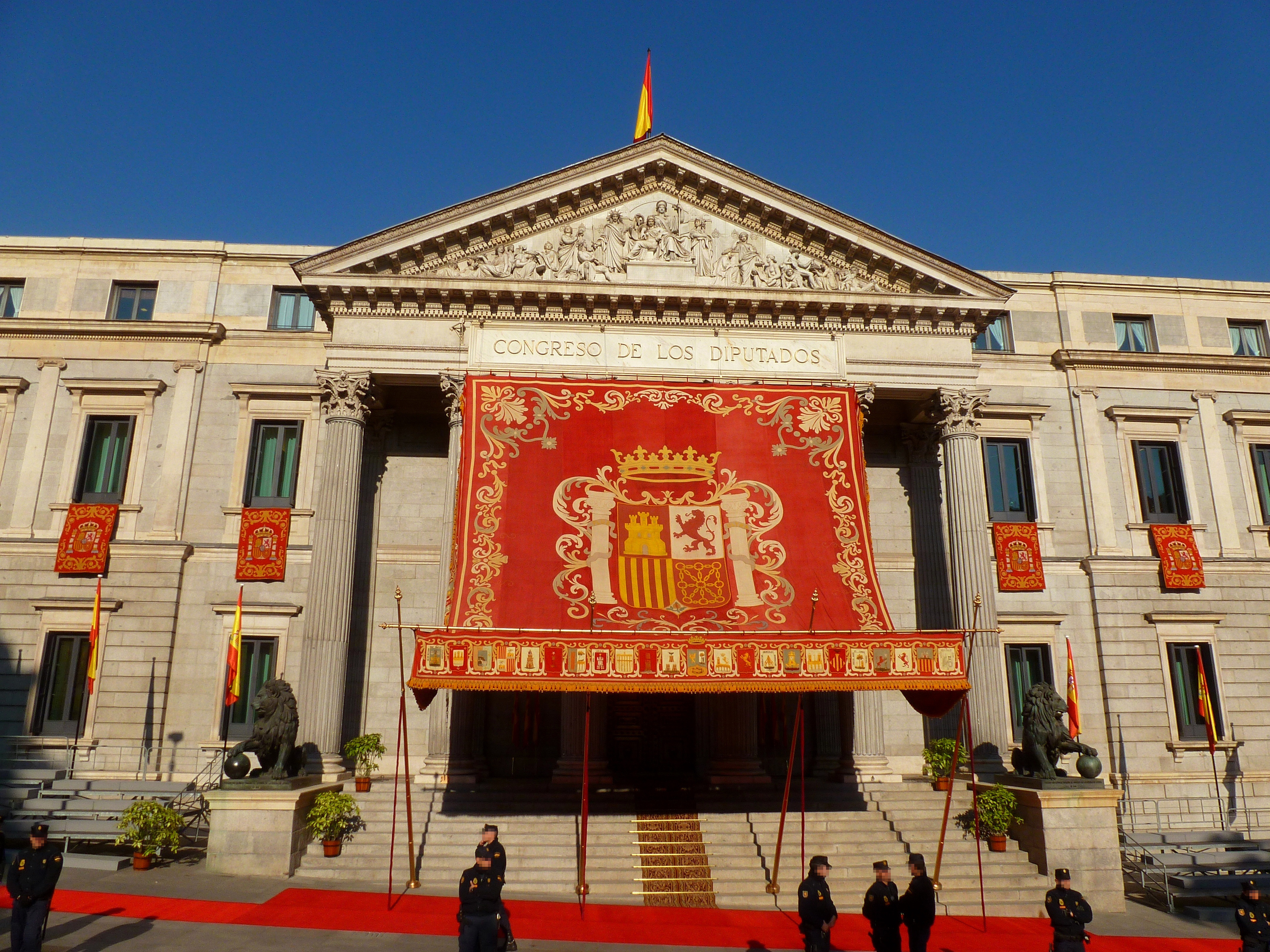
Congress of the Deputies entrance decorated for the event

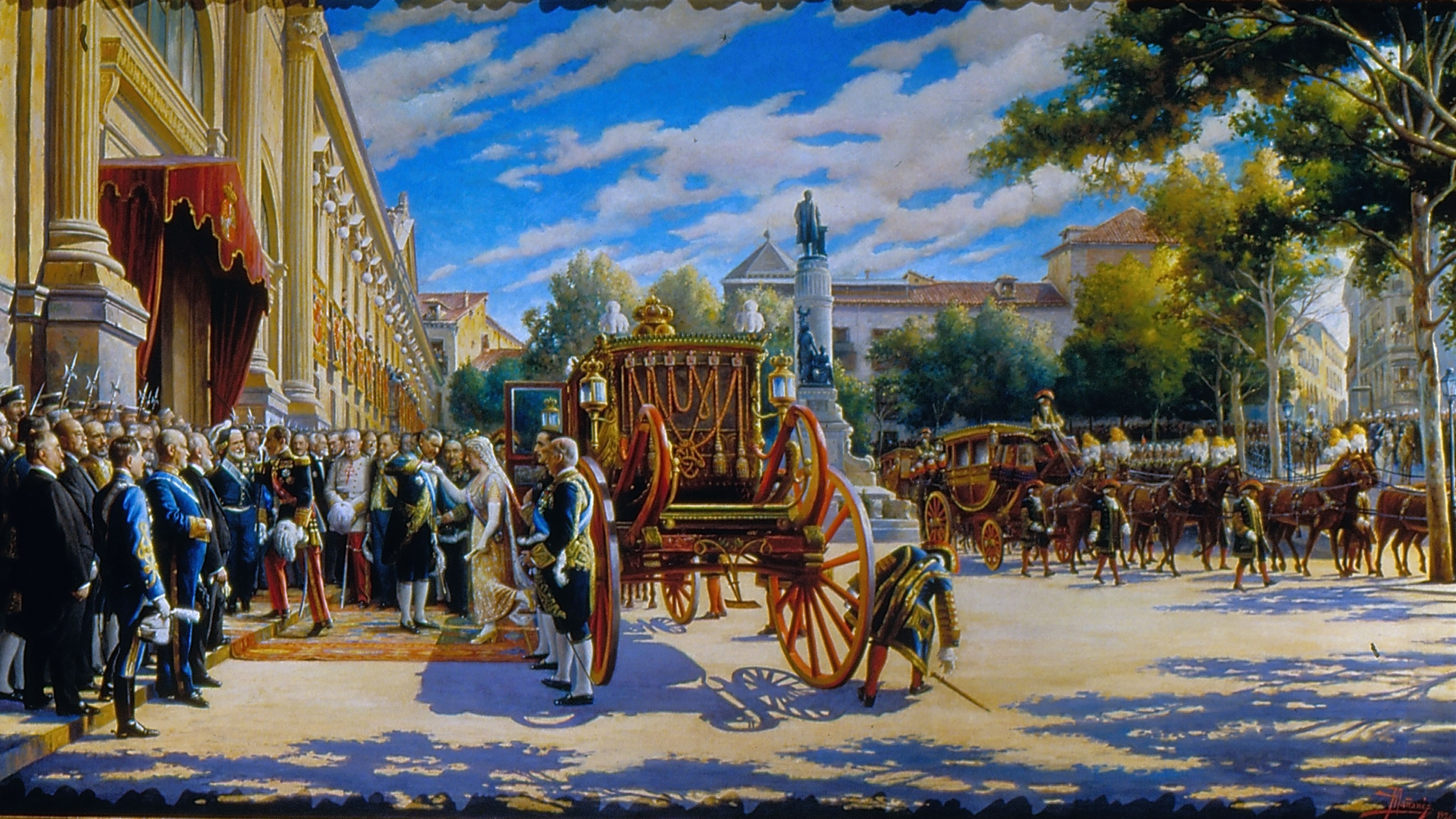
Solemn Opening in 1919, by Asterio Mañanós Martínez.

The Solemn Opening of the Parliament (Spanish: Solemne Apertura de las Cortes Generales) of the Kingdom of Spain is an event which takes place approximately in the second week after the investiture of the President of the Government. For this celebration, all the Deputies and Senators that forms the Cortes Generales are summoned, as well as the Government and the main officials of the Judiciary. The event takes place in the Chamber of Congress of the Deputies of the Palace of the Cortes. It is carried out between large security measures, both inside and outside of the Palace of the Cortes.

Firstly, The King arrives at the Palace of the Cortes, wearing the Congressional and Senate Gold Medals and escorted by the Royal Escort. Once there, he is received by the President of the Government and by the Chief of the Defence Staff; later, the national anthem is played and the King reviews the battalion of honors formed by members of the three armies and the Civil Guard. Then, the King and his family approach at the steps of the Palace of the Cortes where they greet the presidents (speakers) of the Congress and Senate as well as the members of the Bureaus of both chambers (In Spain, a Bureau is the governing body of a legislative chamber, formed by the President of the chamber, the vice presidents and the secretaries). It is in that moment when it is reached, according to some, the most exciting and symbolic moment of the event, which is the opening of the Doors of the Lions of the Congress. These doors are only open in very special moments.

Finally, the Monarch arrives at the hemicycle of the Congress of the Deputies, where he receives a great ovation, and then starts the speeches; the first is the speech of the President of the Congress and later, the King's speech.

To finish off the act, a few official portraits of the King with the main authorities of the three powers of the State are taken, in addition to greeting the guests. In the outside, a military parade is carried out to finalizes the act.

== See also ==
- State Opening of Parliament
