= State Opening of Parliament =

Ceremonial event marking the beginning of a session of the UK Parliament

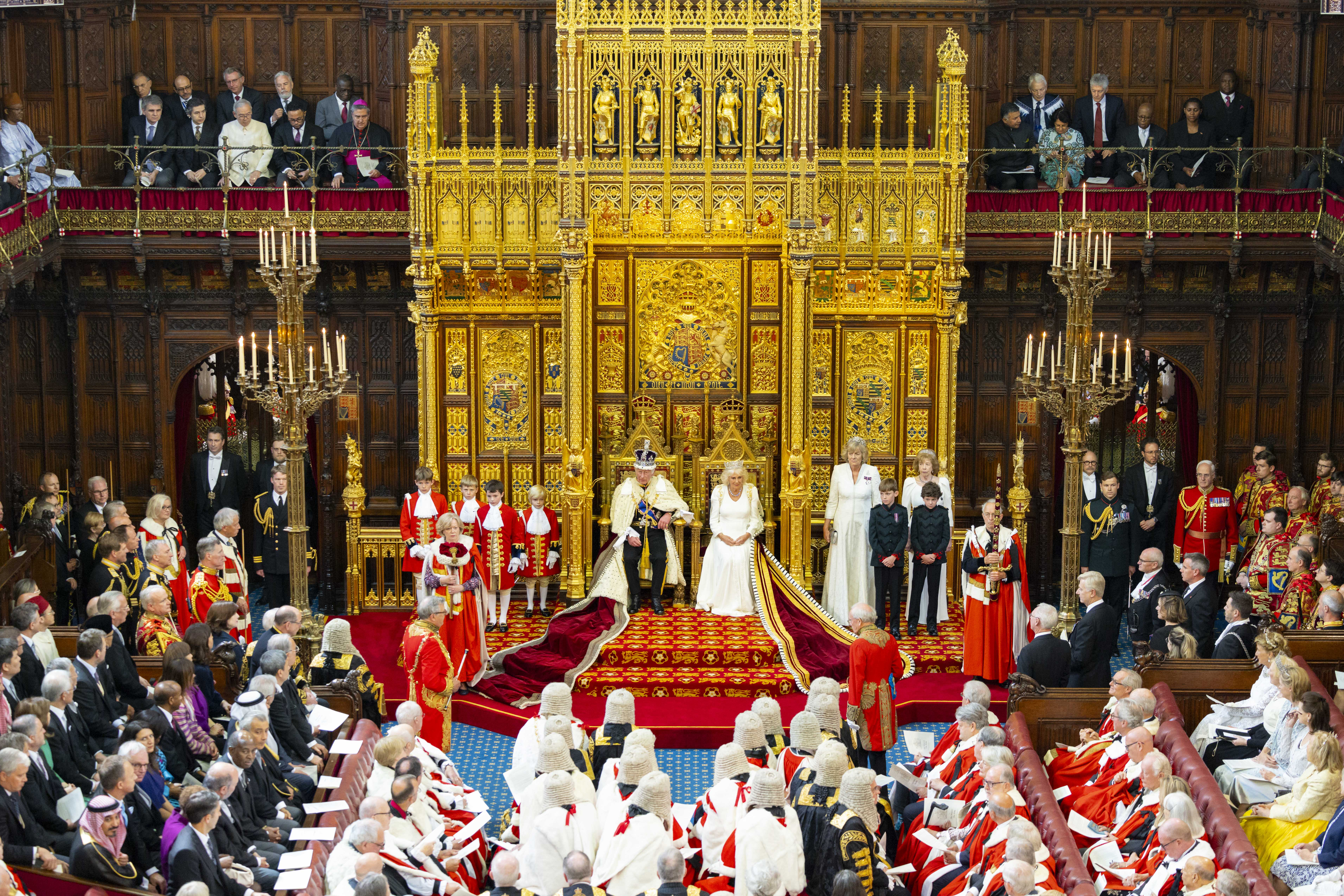
The 2024 State Opening of Parliament.

The State Opening of Parliament is a ceremonial event which formally marks the beginning of each session of the Parliament of the United Kingdom. At its core is the Monarch's "gracious speech from the throne", which is also known as the King's or Queen's Speech, is read by the monarch but written by the government of the day. In the speech the monarch gives notice of forthcoming state visits, before setting out the government's legislative programme for the new parliamentary session. No business of either the House of Lords or the House of Commons can proceed until the Sovereign's speech has been delivered.

The State Opening takes place in the House of Lords chamber within the Palace of Westminster on the first day of the new parliamentary session. This traditionally tends to fall in November, but can occur at any time of year depending on the timing of general elections and parliamentary session start dates. (Note: While the Fixed-term Parliaments Act 2011 was in force the Opening of Parliament routinely took place in May.) It takes place in front of a formal gathering of both Houses of Parliament; the monarch customarily wears the Imperial State Crown and a Robe of State, and members of the House of Lords wear their parliament robes. Members of the House of Commons on the other hand wear day dress.

State Openings of Parliament are documented from as early as the 14th century and the first visual depictions date from the 15th century. The most recent State Opening was held on 13 May 2026, starting the second session of Parliament since the 2024 United Kingdom general election. It was the third of Charles III's reign, the second of the elected Labour government under Sir Keir Starmer, and the second State Opening with a Labour government since 2010.

== Significance ==
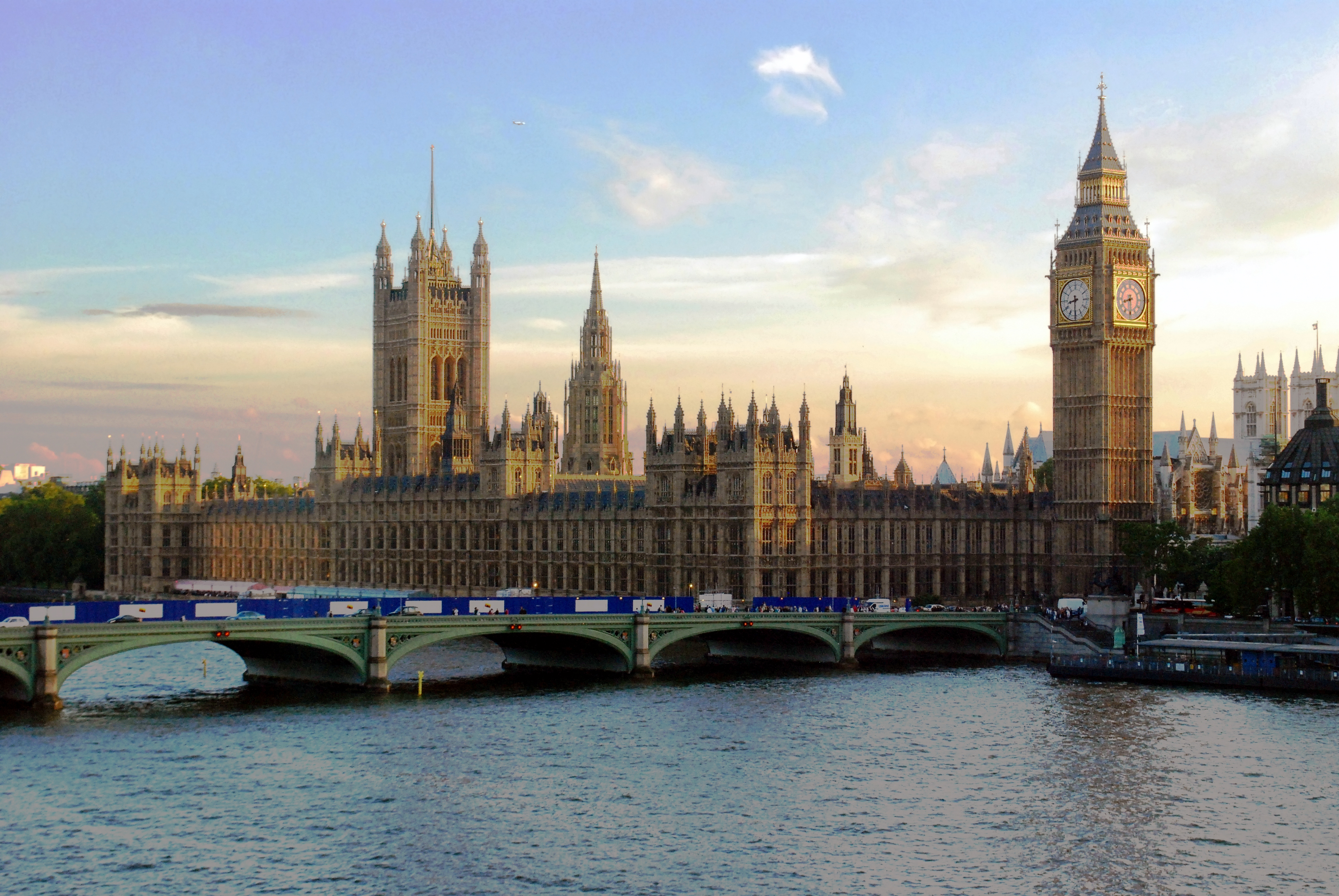
The Palace of Westminster is home of the two houses of the British Parliament, and it is to here that the monarch travels to open parliament.

The State Opening of Parliament is a ceremony filled with historical ritual, constitutional symbolism and practical significance relating to the governance of the United Kingdom.

Parliament is composed of the Sovereign, the House of Lords and the House of Commons, and a State Opening is the only routine occasion when the three are gathered together in one place. The monarch is seated on the throne, at one end of the chamber in front of the Cloth of Estate. The consort, if present, is seated alongside the monarch flanked by an entourage of Great Officers of State and members of the Royal Household. The Lords are seated on "the floor of the House" (i.e. in the main body of the chamber), while the Commons attend at "the bar of the House". The bar is a boundary rail at the far end that is facing the throne.

In addition to the Lords themselves, others are provided with seats on the floor of the House on the occasion of a State Opening, namely:

- such members of the Royal Family as His Majesty may direct
- Judges summoned by writ
- the officers and attendants of the House
- such Peeresses and members of the Diplomatic Corps as are in possession of an invitation issued by the Lord Great Chamberlain.

== Sequence of events ==
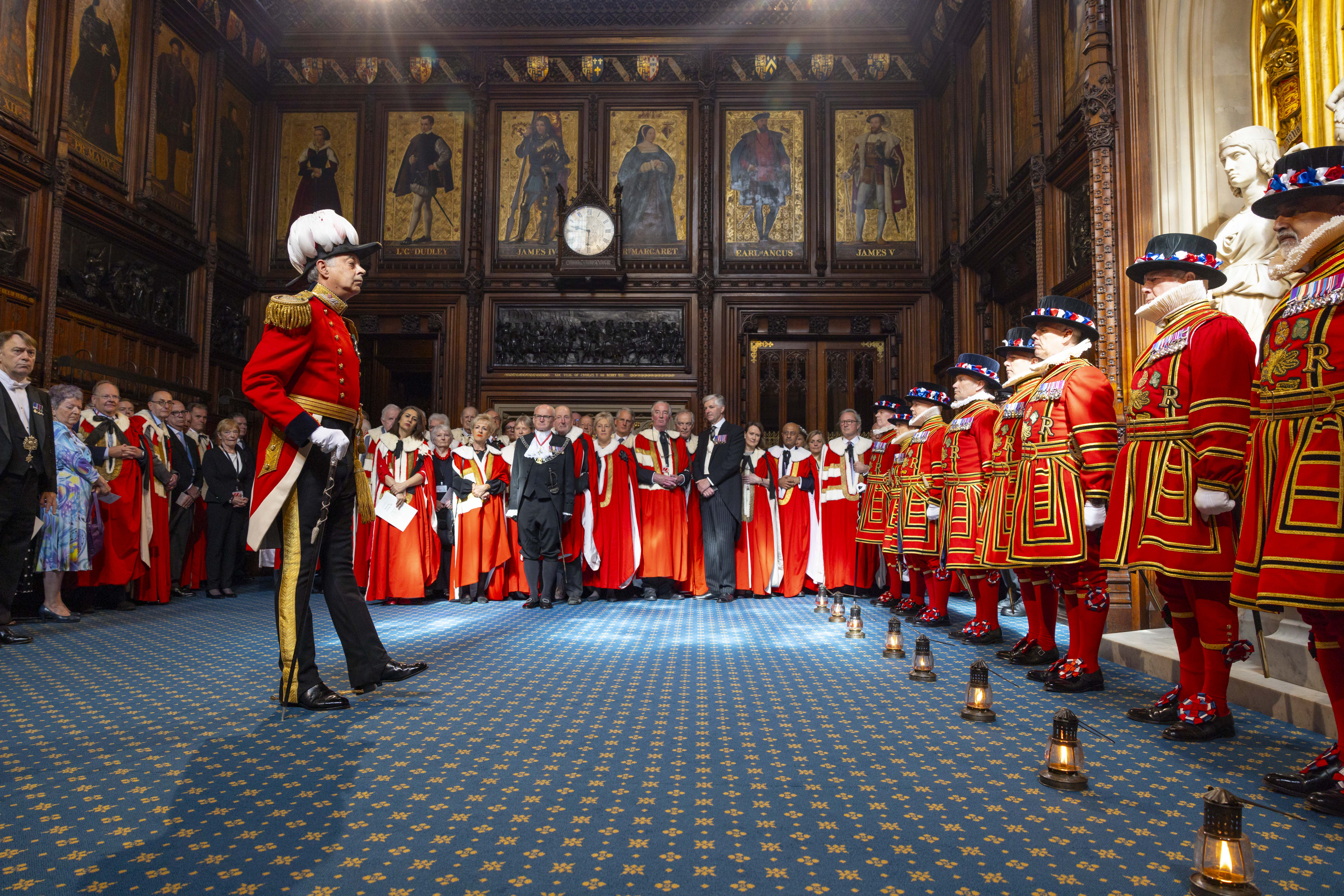
Yeomen of the Guard embarking on their traditional search of the cellars prior to the State Opening (2024).

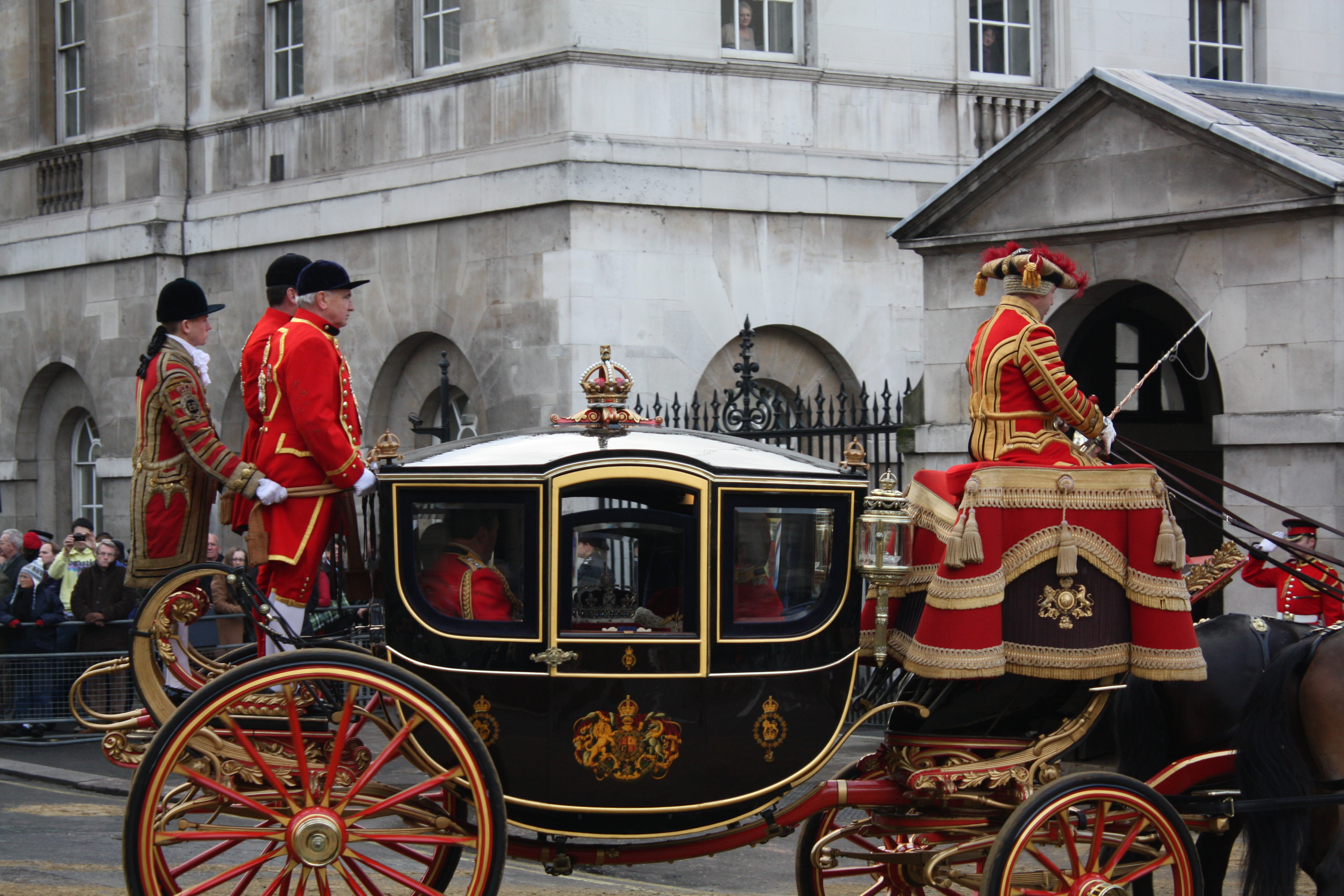
Queen Alexandra's State Coach carrying the Imperial State Crown, which is visible through the central window

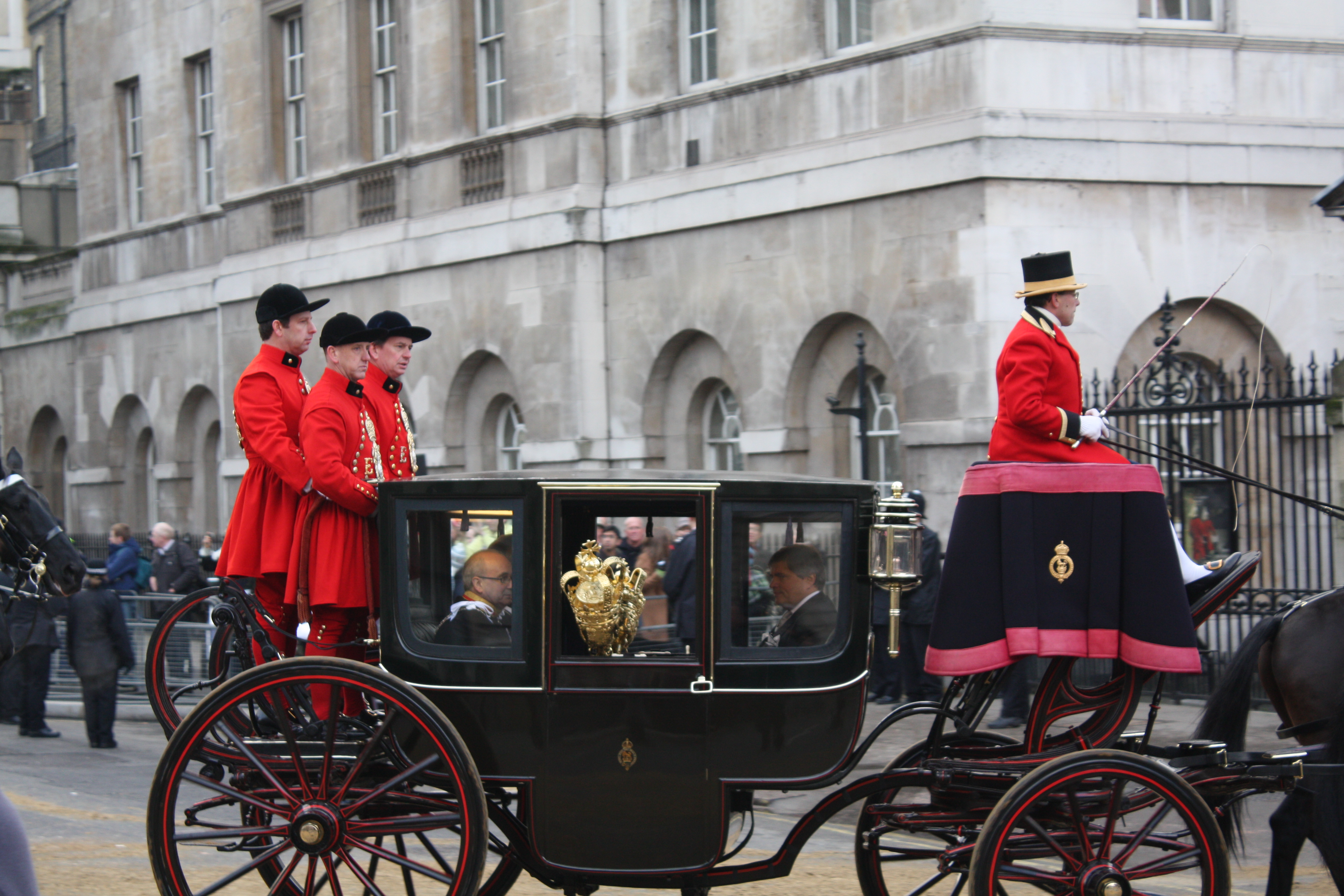
King Edward VII's Town Coach carrying the maces, which are to be carried by the Sergeants-at-Arms in procession

The ceremonial surrounding the opening of parliament can be broken down into several parts. In some cases a more limited ceremony may take place.

=== Searching of the cellars ===
First, the cellars of the Palace of Westminster are searched by the Yeomen of the Guard. This is derived from the 1605 Gunpowder Plot, an attempted assassination of James VI and I in which Guy Fawkes was caught guarding gunpowder in the cellars hours before the king was to open the second session of the Blessed Parliament. Since that year, the cellars have been searched, now largely, but not only, for ceremonial purposes. This is supervised by the Lord Great Chamberlain, and the Yeomen are paid for their services with a small glass of port wine.

=== Assembly of Peers and Commons ===
Peers and peeresses assemble in the House of Lords. The Lords Spiritual and the Lords Temporal wear their Parliament robes for the occasion. They are joined by senior representatives of the judiciary, who sit on woolsacks in the centre of the Chamber, and members of the diplomatic corps, who are seated behind the Bishops. The Commons assemble in their own chamber, wearing ordinary day dress, and begin the day, as any other, with prayers. Beforehand the Speaker's Procession takes place in the usual way: preceded by a doorkeeper, the Serjeant at Arms, leads the Speaker of the House of Commons from his official residence to the Commons Chamber, followed by his trainbearer, chaplain and secretary. In the Central Lobby, a police inspector makes the traditional cry of "Hats off, strangers!", instructing those assembled to remove their hats in deference to the highest-ranking commoner in the realm.

=== Delivery of parliamentary hostage ===
On the morning of the State Opening, the Treasurer, Comptroller and Vice-Chamberlain of the Household, all of whom are government whips, assemble with other senior members of the Royal Household at Buckingham Palace, carrying their ceremonial white staves of office. The Treasurer and Comptroller, along with other senior members of the Royal Household, accompany the monarch in the carriage procession; but the Lord Chamberlain does not join them. Instead, on behalf of the monarch, he remains at Buckingham Palace keeping one MP, usually the Vice-Chamberlain, "hostage" for the duration of the state opening, by tradition as a surety for the safe return of the monarch. The hostage MP is well entertained until the successful conclusion of the ceremony, when they are released upon the safe return of the monarch. The Vice-Chamberlain's imprisonment is now purely ceremonial, though they do remain under guard; originally, it guaranteed the safety of the Sovereign as they entered a possibly hostile Parliament. The tradition is said to stem from the time of Charles I, who had a contentious relationship with Parliament and was eventually beheaded in 1649 during the Civil War between the monarchy and Parliament. A copy of his death warrant is displayed in the robing room used by the monarch as a ceremonial reminder of what can happen to a monarch who attempts to interfere with Parliament. However, it has been suggested that the custom in its present form is of much more recent origin with mention of hostage-taking only dating back to the 1960s or 70s. In 1845, by contrast, the Lord Chamberlain's routine absence from the State Opening was said to be due to "the department over which his lordship presides not being acknowledged in His Majesty's Palace at Westminster" where the Lord Great Chamberlain instead has the equivalent authority.

Hostage MPs in recent years have included:

- 2014: Desmond Swayne
- 2015–16: Kris Hopkins
- 2017: Chris Heaton-Harris
- 2019: Stuart Andrew
- 2021: Marcus Jones
- 2022: James Morris
- 2023: Jo Churchill
- 2024: Samantha Dixon
- 2026: Nic Dakin

=== Arrival of royal regalia ===
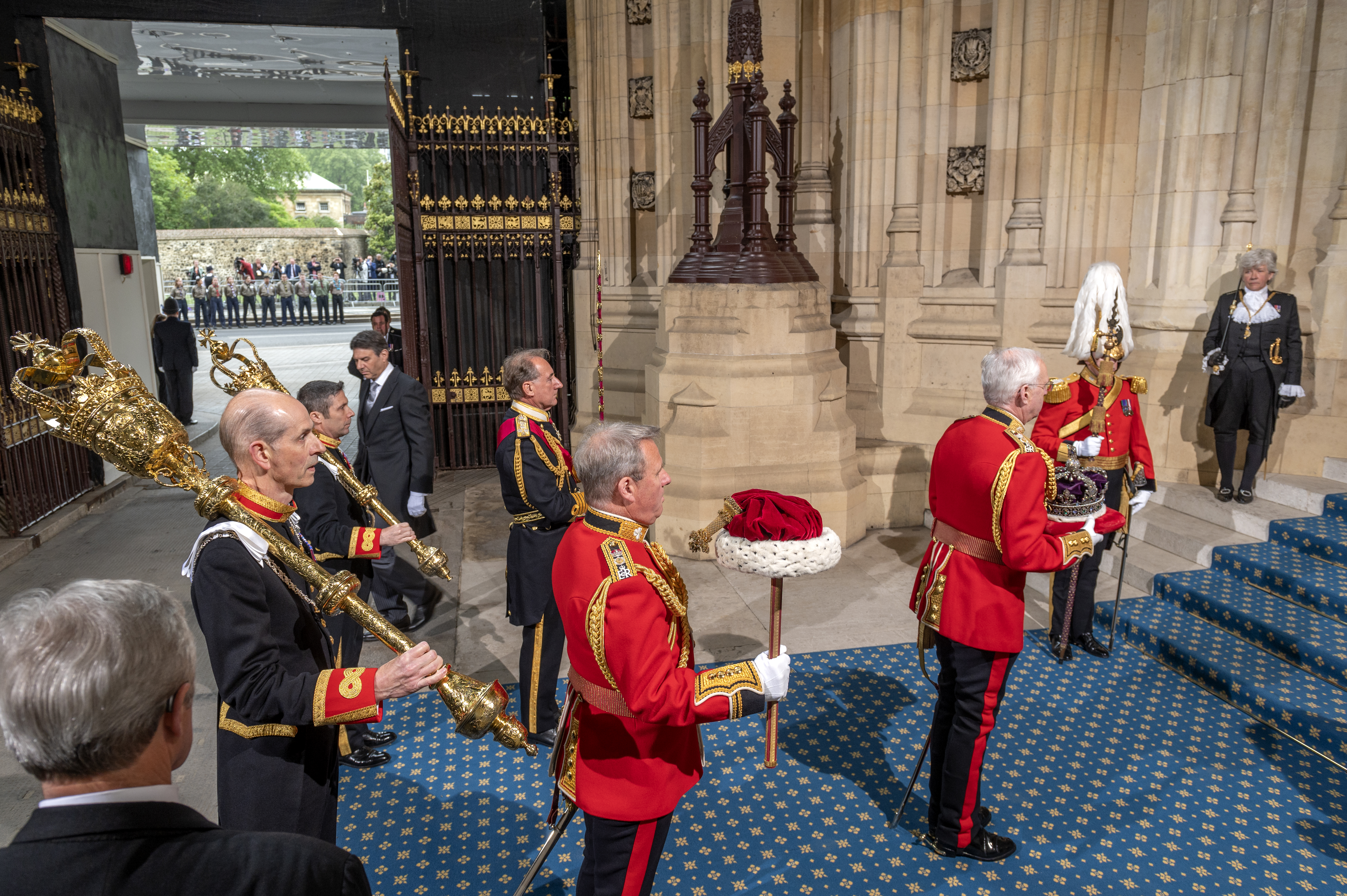
Arrival of the Regalia at the Sovereign's Entrance (2022).

Before the arrival of the sovereign, the Imperial State Crown is brought to the Palace of Westminster, together with the Great Sword of State and the Cap of Maintenance, in their own carriage, usually Queen Alexandra's State Coach. The King's Bargemaster and Watermen accompany it, acting as footmen as a reminder of past times when the regalia were brought from the Tower of London by river. On arrival at the Sovereign's Entrance, under the Victoria Tower, the Crown is passed by the Bargemaster to the Comptroller of the Lord Chamberlain's Office, under the watchful eye of the Crown Jeweller. The regalia are then carried to be displayed in the Royal Gallery. Also in the procession, usually in King Edward VII's Town Coach, are the two maces (separate from the three used by parliament) which are carried by the Serjeants-at-Arms of the Royal Household who escort the regalia in procession.

=== Arrival of the Sovereign ===
The monarch travels "in State" from Buckingham Palace to the Palace of Westminster, arriving at the Sovereign's Entrance under the Victoria Tower. Travelling in a state coach, (Note: Since 2014 the Diamond Jubilee State Coach has typically, but not always, been used.) the monarch is usually accompanied by his or her consort and sometimes by other members of the royal family. Senior members of the Royal Household follow in other carriages. The Household Cavalry Mounted Regiment provides a Sovereign's Escort, and other members of the armed forces line the processional route from Buckingham Palace to the Palace of Westminster.

At the monarch's arrival, the national anthem is played, a gun salute is sounded in Green Park and the Royal Standard is hoisted in place of the Union Flag at the top of the Victoria Tower where it remains until the monarch departs. The monarch is greeted on arrival by the Lord Great Chamberlain , whose duty is to oversee the royal areas of the Palace of Westminster, and the Earl Marshal, who has responsibility for State ceremonies, before proceeding to the Robing Room, where they put on the Parliament Robe of State (Note: Over this robe is worn the collar and George of the Order of the Garter; the George used is a larger than usual gold representation of St. George slaying a dragon and heavily set with diamonds made for George III.) and the Imperial State Crown.

=== Procession to the Chamber ===
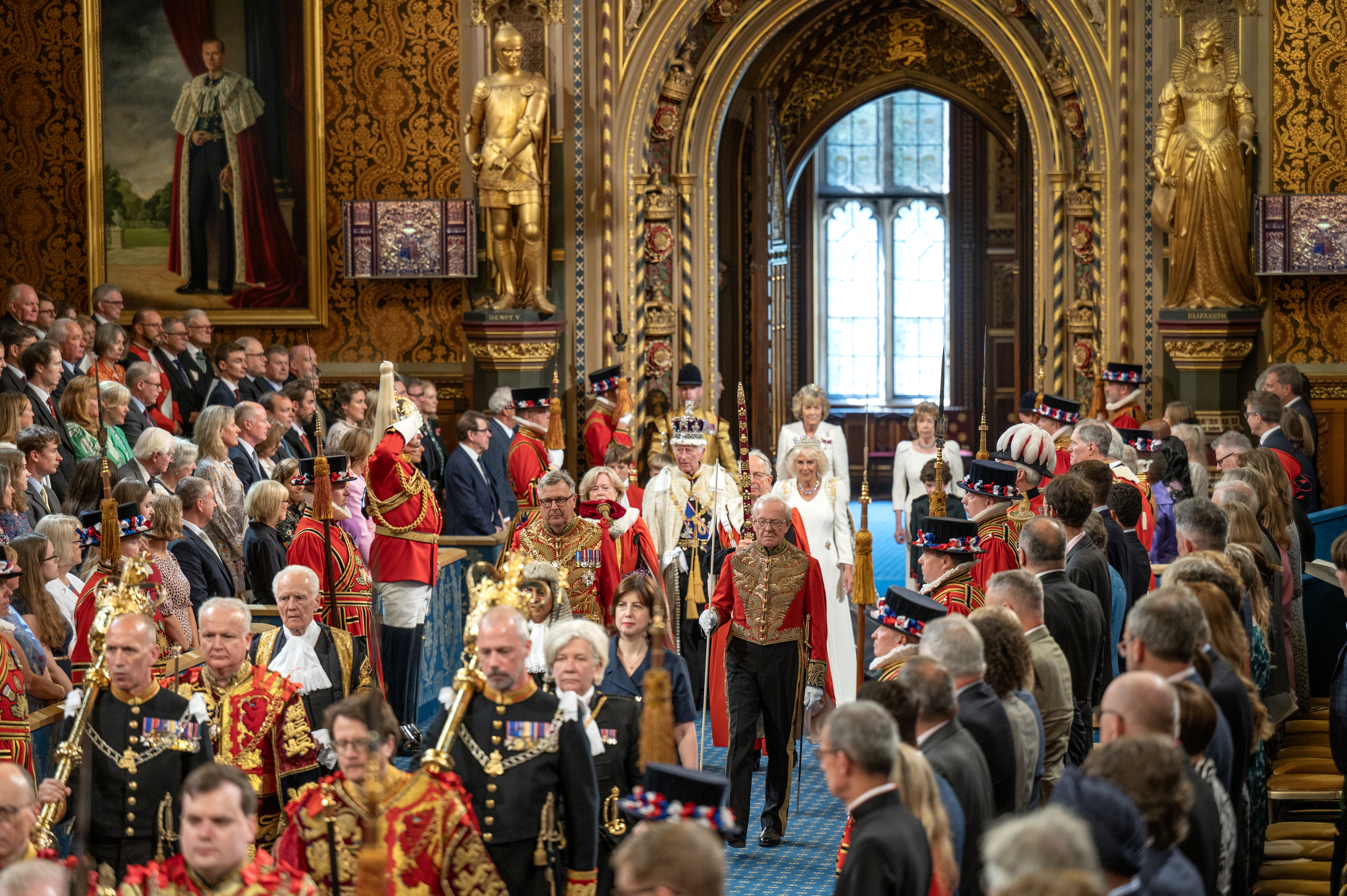
The King and Queen emerge from the Robing Room in 2024, accompanied by Heralds, Serjeants at Arms, Great Officers of State and members of the Royal Household.

A procession is formed of heralds, Great Officers of State and members of the Royal Household, and when all is ready a fanfare is sounded and the monarch proceeds in State through the Royal Gallery to the House of Lords. Directly ahead of the monarch walk two peers: one (nowadays usually the Leader of the House of Lords) carrying the Cap of Maintenance, and the other (nowadays generally a retired senior military officer) carrying the Great Sword of State. Once seated on the throne, the monarch, wearing the Imperial State Crown, instructs the House by saying, "My Lords, pray be seated"; his or her consort, if present, sits on a throne to the sovereign's left, and his or her children, if present, may be provided with seats elsewhere on the dais. (Note: The House of Lords Precedence Act 1539 permits that "none but the King’s Children shall sit on either Side of the Cloth of Estate in Parliament", though the privilege has also customarily been extended to the wife of the Prince of Wales.)

The Imperial State Crown has not been worn invariably: for example, on four occasions in the 20th century Parliament was opened by as yet uncrowned monarchs (i.e. after their accession to the throne, but before their coronation); on these occasions the robe of state was worn but the crown was not. Instead on those occasions it was carried on a cushion by one of the Great Officers of State.

=== Royal summons of the Commons to the Lords' chamber ===
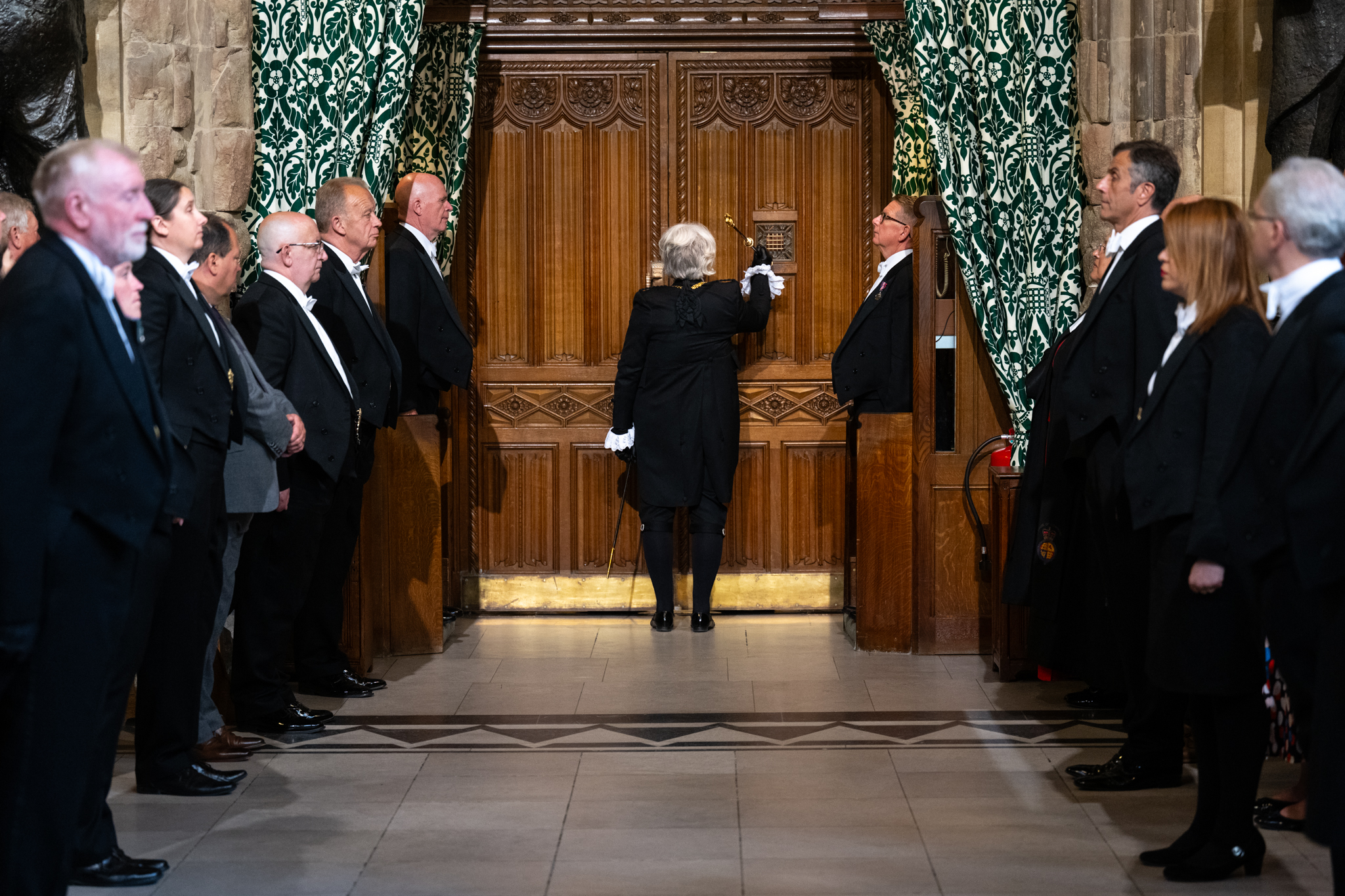
Sarah Clarke (Black Rod) knocks on the chamber door, 2024

Motioned by the monarch, the Lord Great Chamberlain raises his white staff of office to signal the official known as Black Rod to summon the House of Commons. Black Rod turns and, under the escort of the Door-keeper of the House of Lords, proceeds to the Members' Lobby of the House of Commons, and reaches the doors of the Commons.

On Black Rod's approach, the Doorkeeper of the Commons orders that the doors are slammed shut against them, symbolising the rights of parliament and its independence from the monarch. The Usher of the Black Rod then strikes with the end of their ceremonial staff, known as the Black Rod, three times on the closed doors of the Commons Chamber, and is then admitted. Over time the strikes have left an indentation in the door.

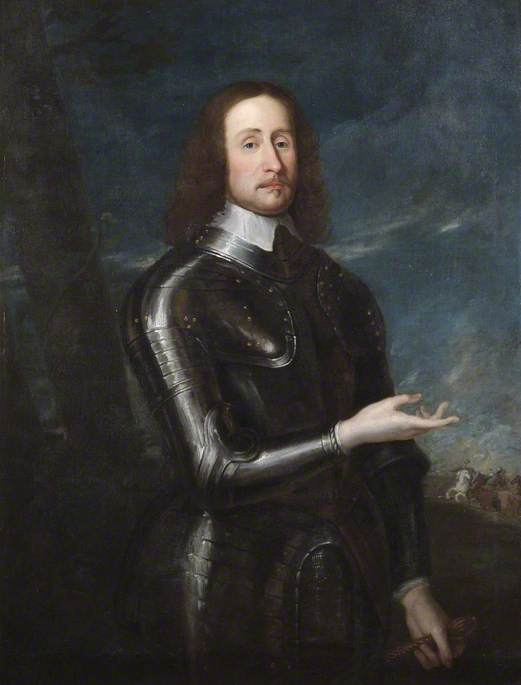
Leading 17th-century parliamentarian John Hampden is one of the Five Members annually commemorated

This ritual is strongly associated with the occasion when King Charles I stormed into the House of Commons in 1642 in an unsuccessful attempt to arrest five members of Parliament, including the celebrated English patriot and leading parliamentarian John Hampden. The door-closing ritual, however, predates the 1640s, and although it has long since come to symbolise the independence of the Commons, its primary purpose according to Erskine May is for the Commons to establish Black Rod's identity. Once this has been achieved, Black Rod cannot be refused admission, and all other business of whatever kind in the Commons chamber must cease.

The doors having been opened, the chief doorkeeper of the House of Commons introduces Black Rod. At the bar, Black Rod bows to the Speaker before proceeding to the table, bowing again, and announcing the command of the monarch for the attendance of the Commons, in the following words:

Mr/Madam Speaker, The King/Queen commands this honourable House to attend His/Her Majesty immediately in the House of Peers.

External videos
- Dennis Skinner- A collection of quips to Blackrod from 1989-2013-State Opening of Parliament — via YouTube

During the later decades of Elizabeth II's reign, a tradition developed for this command to be greeted with a defiant topical comment by republican-leaning Labour MP for Bolsover Dennis Skinner, upon which, with some mirth, the House rose to make its way to the Lords' Chamber. This customary intervention was omitted by Mr Skinner in 2015, claiming that he had "bigger fish to fry than uttering something", due to a dispute over seating with the Scottish Nationalists. Skinner resumed the practice in 2016, until he was unseated in 2019. During the reign of Charles III, at the 2026 State Opening of Parliament, Torcuil Crichton, the Scottish Labour MP for Na h-Eileanan an Iar, resumed Skinner's tradition by remarking "Not now Andy." when Gentleman Usher of the Black Rod Lieutenant General Ed Davis struck the door, in reference to then-speculation of Great Manchester Mayor Andy Burnham re-running for Parliament and challenging Prime Minister Keir Starmer in a leadership contest.

=== Procession of the Commons ===
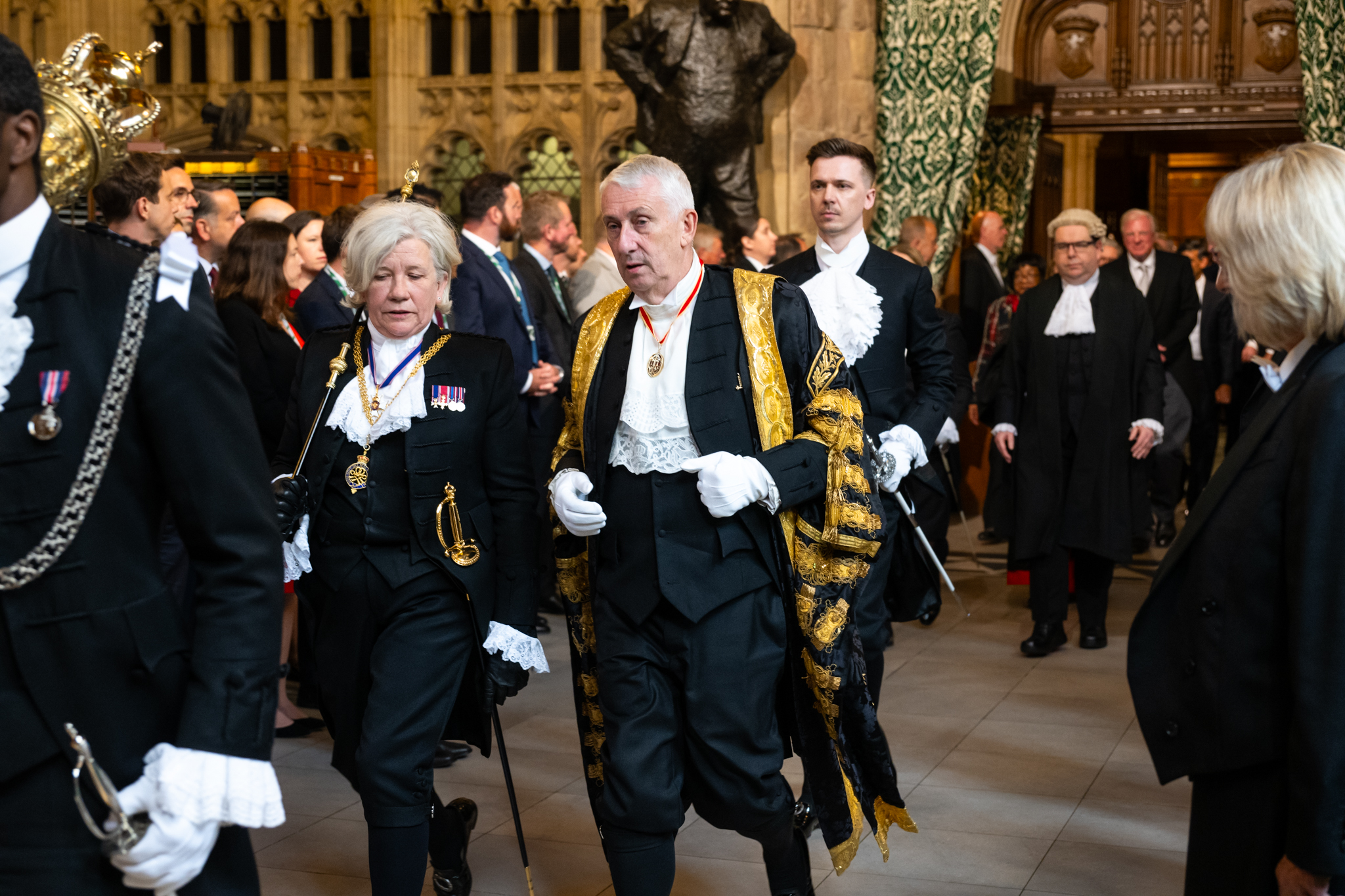
The procession in 2024: Lady Usher of the Black Rod Dame Sarah Clarke walking with Speaker of the House of Commons Sir Lindsay Hoyle. Off frame on the left in front of them is Serjeant at Arms of the House of Commons Ugbana Oyet.

The Speaker proceeds to attend the summons at once. The Serjeant-at-Arms picks up the ceremonial mace and, with the Speaker and Black Rod, leads the Members of the House of Commons as they walk, in pairs, towards the House of Lords. By custom, the members saunter, with much discussion and joking, rather than formally process. The Prime Minister and the Leader of the Opposition followed by The Deputy Prime Minister, First Secretary of State or another member of the government and the Deputy Leader of the Opposition usually walk side by side, leading the two lines of MPs. The Commons then arrive at the Bar of the House of Lords. The only people required to bow are the House of Commons Speaker, Commons Clerk, senior Lords official Black Rod and the Serjeant-at-Arms. No person who is not a member of the Upper House may pass the Bar unbidden when it is in session; a similar rule applies to the Commons. They remain standing at the Bar during the speech.

=== Delivery of the speech from the throne ===
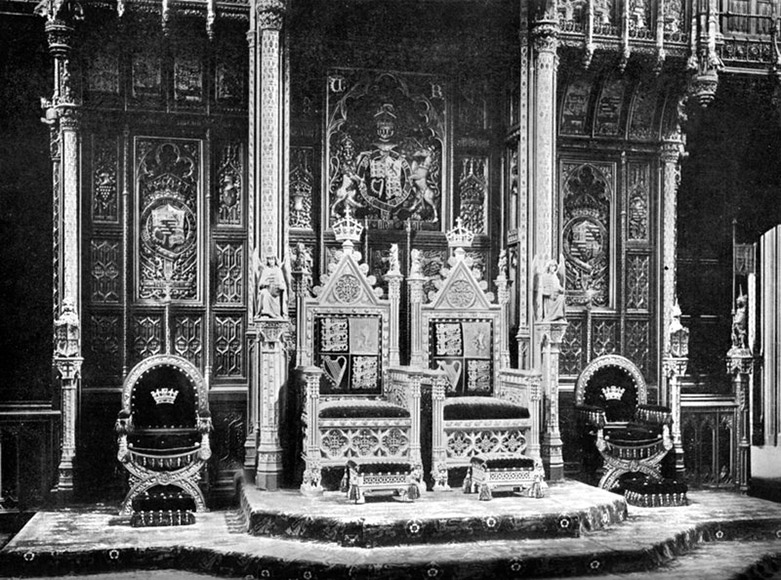
The royal thrones, c. 1902

The monarch reads a prepared speech, known as the "Speech from the Throne" or the "King's/Queen's Speech", outlining the Government's agenda for the coming year. The speech is written by the prime minister and their cabinet members, and reflects the legislative agenda for which the Government seeks the agreement of both Houses of Parliament. It is traditionally written on goatskin vellum, and presented on bended knee for the monarch to read by the Lord Chancellor, who produces the scroll from a satchel-like bag. Traditionally, rather than turning their back on the Sovereign, which might appear disrespectful, the Lord Chancellor walks backwards down the steps of the throne, continuing to face the monarch. Lord Irvine of Lairg, the Lord Chancellor at the time, sought to break the custom and applied successfully for permission to turn his back on the sovereign and walk down the steps forwards. The next Lord Chancellor, Jack Straw, continued the former tradition but succeeding Lords Chancellor have mostly chosen to walk forwards.

The whole speech is addressed to "My Lords and Members of the House of Commons", with one significant exception that the monarch says specifically, "Members of the House of Commons, estimates for the public services will be laid before you", since the budget is constitutionally reserved to the Commons.

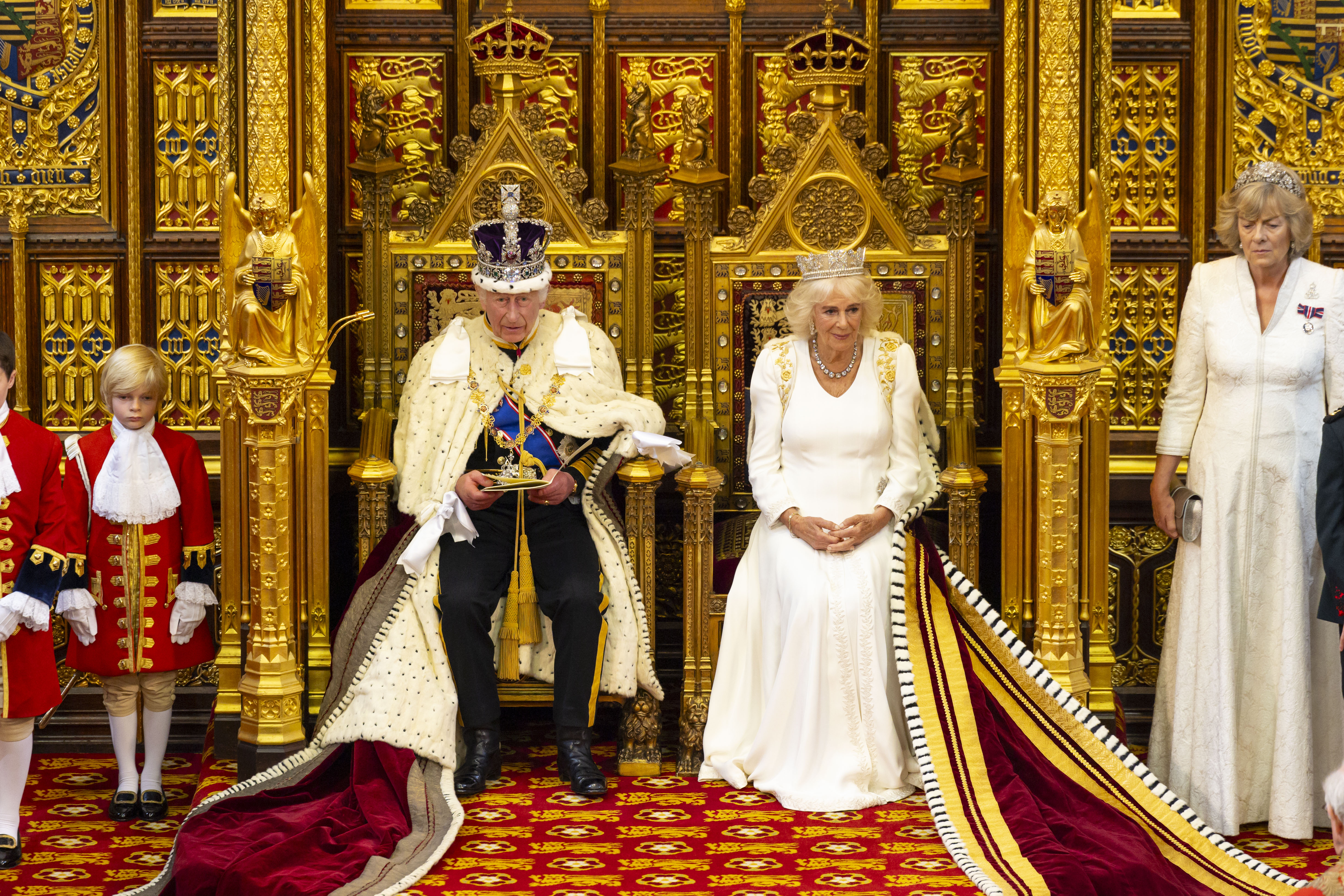
The King reading the speech from the throne in 2024.

The monarch reads the entire speech in a neutral and formal tone, implying neither approval nor disapproval of the proposals of their Government: the monarch makes constant reference to "My Government" when reading the text. After listing the main bills to be introduced during the session, the monarch states: "Other measures will be laid before you", thus leaving the government scope to introduce bills not mentioned in the speech. The monarch mentions any state visits they intend to make and also any planned state visits of foreign heads of state to the United Kingdom during the parliamentary session. The monarch concludes the speech in saying: "My Lords and Members of the House of Commons, I pray that the blessing of Almighty God may rest upon your counsels."

Traditionally, the members of both houses of Parliament listen to the speech respectfully, showing neither approval or dissent towards its contents before it is debated in each house. This silence, however, was broken in 1998, when Queen Elizabeth II announced the government's plan of abolishing the right of hereditary peers to automatically sit in the House of Lords. A few Labour members of the House of Commons cried "yes" and "hear", prompting several of the Lords to shout "no" and "shame". The Queen continued delivering her speech without any pause, ignoring the intervention. The conduct of those who interrupted the speech was strongly criticised at the time.

Edward VIII described his speech from the throne at his sole state opening in 1936 as "one of monumental dullness ... all very solemn and not a word of it was mine".

=== Departure of monarch ===
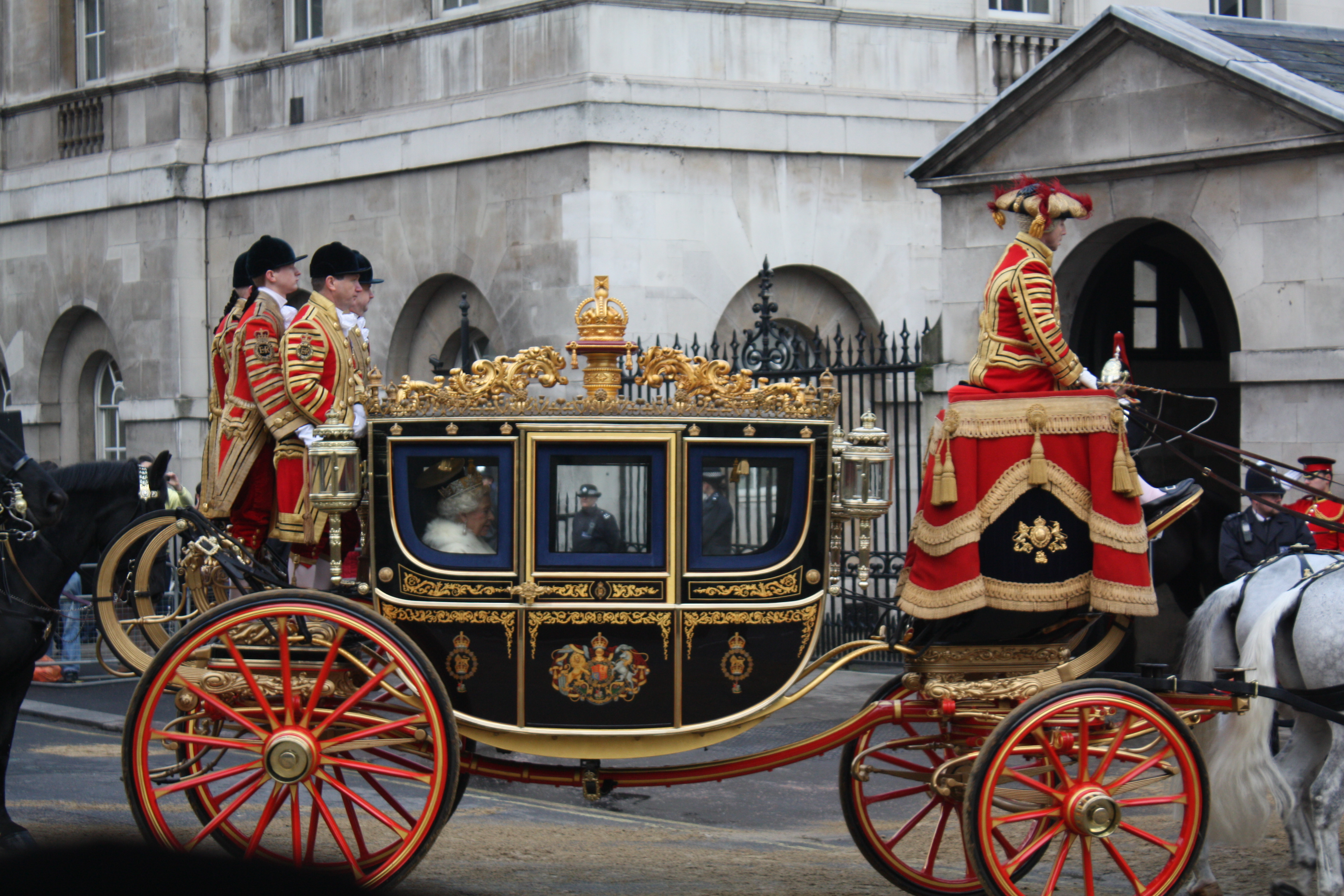
Queen Elizabeth II returns to Buckingham Palace in the Irish State Coach via Whitehall and Horse Guards in 2008

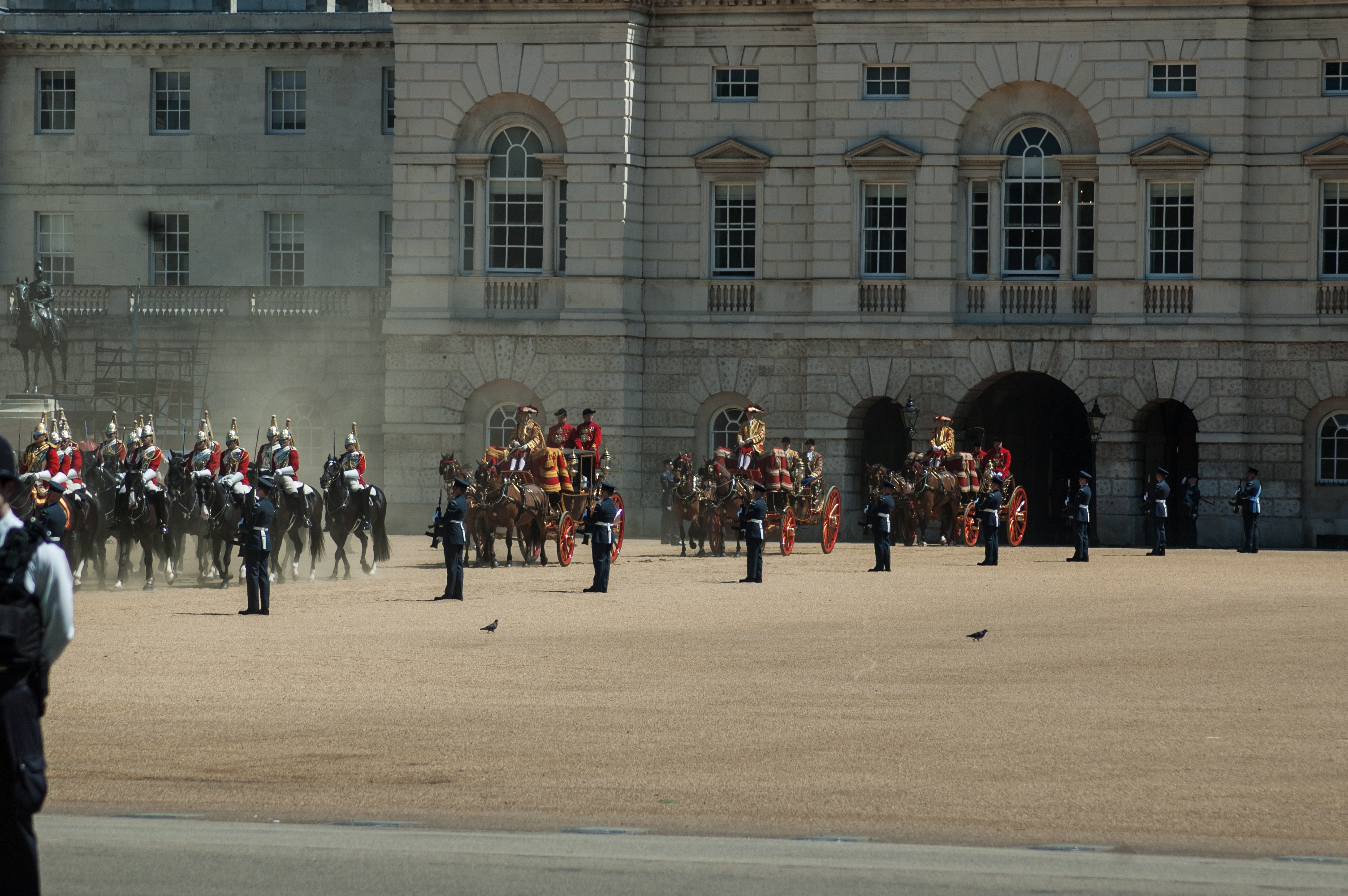
The return procession crossing Horse Guards Parade in 2015

Following the speech, the monarch and his or her retinue leave the chamber. The monarch bows to both sides of the House of Peers and then leaves the chamber, walking in procession back to the Robing Room, before the Commons bow again and return to their Chamber.

=== Debate on the speech ===
After the departure of the monarch from the palace, each Chamber proceeds to the consideration of an "Address in Reply to His/ Her Majesty's Gracious Speech." But first, each House considers a bill pro forma to symbolise their right to deliberate independently of the monarch. In the House of Lords, the bill is called the Select Vestries Bill, while the Commons equivalent is the Outlawries Bill. The bills are considered for the sake of ceremony only, and do not make any actual legislative progress. For the address in reply, a chosen member moves "That a humble Address be presented to His Majesty, as follows". The following is the form used in the House of Lords and is nearly identical to that used in the House of Commons:

Most Gracious Sovereign, We, Your Majesty's most dutiful and loyal subjects, the Lords Spiritual and Temporal in Parliament assembled, beg leave to thank Your Majesty for the most gracious Speech which Your Majesty has addressed to both Houses of Parliament.

The first speech of the debate in the Commons is, by tradition, a humorous one given by a member selected in advance. The consideration of the address in reply to the Throne Speech is the occasion for a debate on the Government's agenda. The debate on the Address in Reply is spread over several days. On each day, a different topic, such as foreign affairs or finance, is considered. The debate provides an indication of the views of Parliament regarding the government's agenda.

Following this debate, a vote is taken on the Government Programme. This vote is treated as a vote of no confidence and losing this vote will automatically trigger a general election. When the Fixed-term Parliaments Act was in force, a general election was not automatically triggered if the vote was lost.

== Variations ==
=== Openings in the absence of the monarch ===
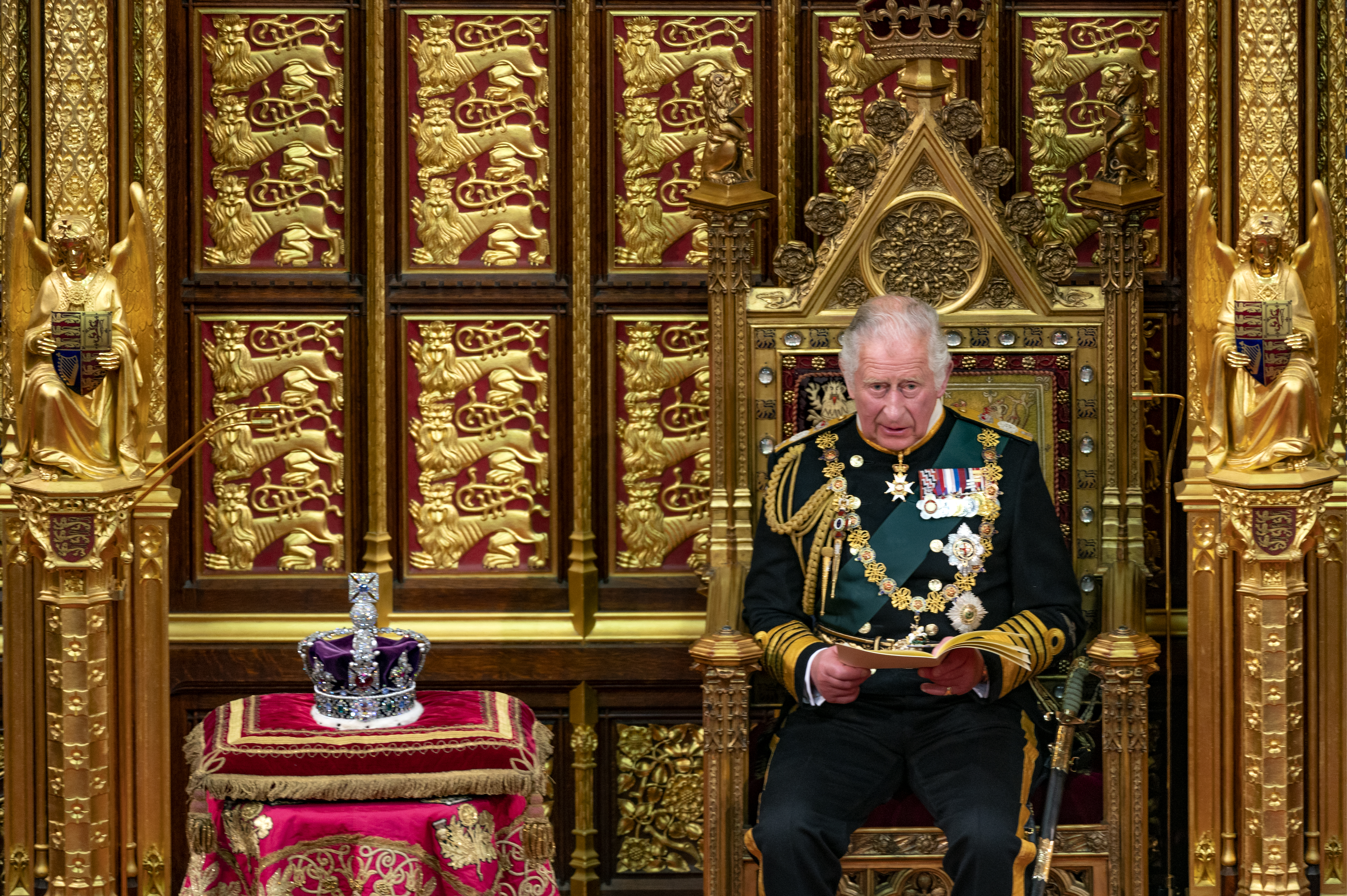
King Charles III, at the time the Prince of Wales, reading the speech on behalf of his mother, Queen Elizabeth II in 2022.

Since 1901, the monarch has opened Parliament in person on all but six occasions. In 1929 and 1935 King George V was too ill to attend; in 1951 King George VI was too ill to attend; in 1959 and 1963 Queen Elizabeth II was pregnant and did not attend. In each of these years Lords Commissioners were appointed to preside over the opening, with the speech being read by the Presiding Commissioner (namely the Lord Chancellor). The speech was prefaced with the words:

My Lords and Members of the House of Commons, We are commanded to deliver to you His/Her Majesty's Speech in His/Her Majesty's own words.

In 2022, when the Queen was absent on the day at short notice due to "episodic mobility problems", the heir-apparent to the throne and the heir's eldest son, the then Prince of Wales, now Charles III, and the Duke of Cambridge, now Prince of Wales, were appointed under the authority of section 6 of the Regency Act 1937 to open Parliament as Counsellors of State, with the then-Prince of Wales reading the speech from the consort's throne on this occasion.

=== Reduced ceremonial ===
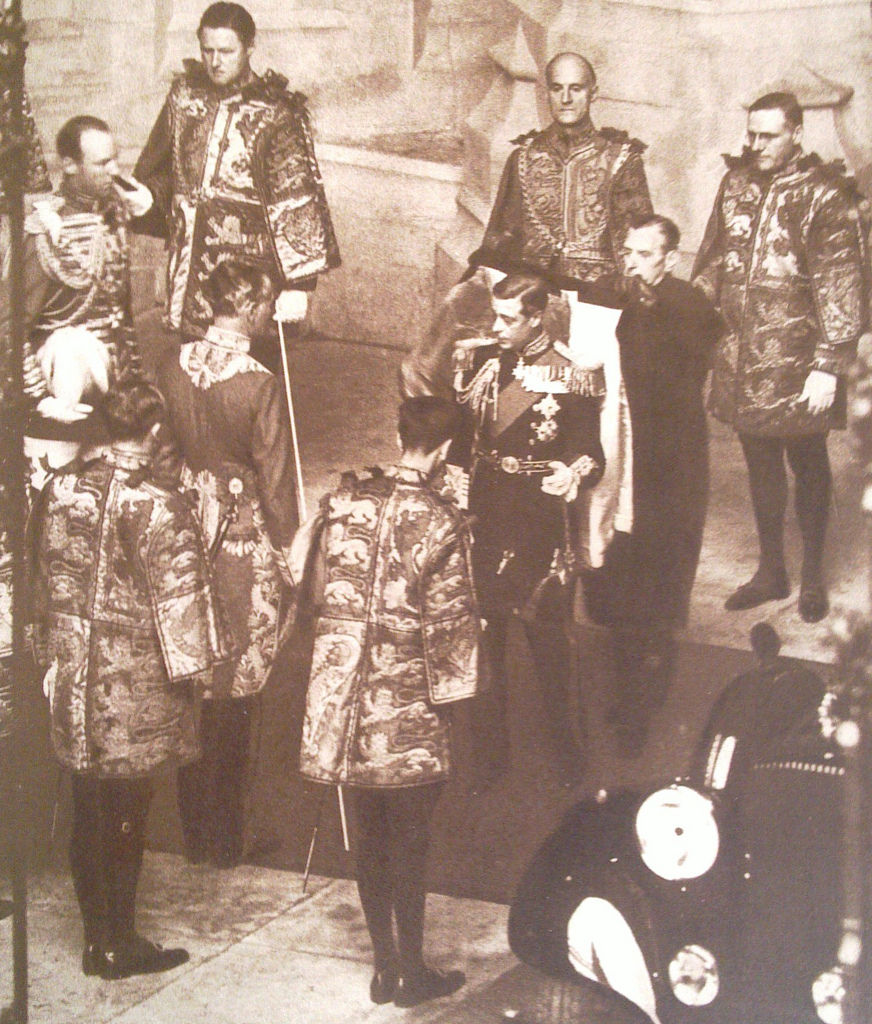
Edward VIII departs following his only State Opening of Parliament, 3 November 1936: due to heavy rain he had 'reluctantly' cancelled the carriage procession and travelled there and back by car.

On certain other occasions through history, ceremonial aspects of the State Opening have been scaled back for specific reasons. These include the plague in 1593, threats of assassination in 1679 and wartime restrictions in place from 1917 to 1919 and 1939–1948.

On three occasions in the reign of Queen Elizabeth II, in March 1974, June 2017 and December 2019, the State Opening was conducted in a "dressed-down" manner, due to the snap general elections held in those years. On these occasions the Queen attended in day dress, rather than the traditional ceremonial robes of state, and the Imperial State Crown was carried in front of the Queen rather than worn. Inside the Palace, there were reduced numbers in the procession, and outside motor cars were used in place of horse-drawn carriages with no military escort accompanying them. Otherwise, the ceremony remained largely the same.

In 2021, the ceremony was scaled down due to the COVID-19 pandemic. The Queen wore day dress and arrived by car at Westminster, where seating was restricted: 74 were allowed in the Lords Chamber, whilst 34 further MPs and peers were able to participate from the gallery. To prevent the spread of the virus, mask-wearing and testing was enforced, and the Lord Chancellor did not directly pass the speech to the Queen, but placed it on a table next to the throne. The State Opening in May 2022 was also scheduled to take place with reduced ceremonial, due to the Queen suffering "episodic mobility problems", which eventually led to her being absent on the day.

=== Double and cancelled Openings ===
Throughout the twentieth century (including in wartime) the State Opening took place on an annual basis, with the following exceptions:

- There were two State Openings in 1914 and no State Opening in 1915;
- There were two State Openings in 1921 (and no State Opening in 1923);

The first State Opening took place on 15 February 1921. Nine months later, on 10 November, Parliament was prorogued to 30 January; in the meantime, negotiations were taking place with regard to an Anglo-Irish Treaty. The treaty was signed on 6 December, and the following day a proclamation was issued summoning Parliament to meet in a week's time: a State Opening duly took place on 14 December, the King declaring 'I have summoned you to meet at this unusual time in order that the Articles of Agreement which have been signed by My Ministers and the Irish Delegation may be at once submitted for your approval. No other business will be brought before you in the present Session'. Parliament was then once again prorogued (to 31 January) on 19 December 1921.

- There were two State Openings in 1924 (and no State Opening in 1925);
- There were two State Openings in 1948 (and no State Opening in 1949).

On 24 June, it was announced that in order to secure the passing of the Parliament Bill, there would be a short session from 14 to 24 September, followed by an adjournment, then a new session from 26 October. On 14 September, the King opened Parliament with a very brief speech (just 74 words), announcing that the only business of the session would be the bill to amend the Parliament Act. On 24 September, it adjourned as planned, and the new session was again opened by the King on 26 October. The two weeks in September formed Parliament's shortest modern session.

- There were two State Openings in 1974.

In the twenty-first century the State Opening continued on an annual basis, with the following exceptions:

- There was no State Opening in 2011, as it was cancelled to ease the pressure for the planned introduction of legislation for fixed-term Parliaments.
- There was no State Opening in 2018, as it was cancelled to lengthen the timeframe for the passing of Brexit-related legislation.
- There were two State Openings in 2019 (and no State Opening in 2020).
- There was no State Opening in 2025.

== History ==
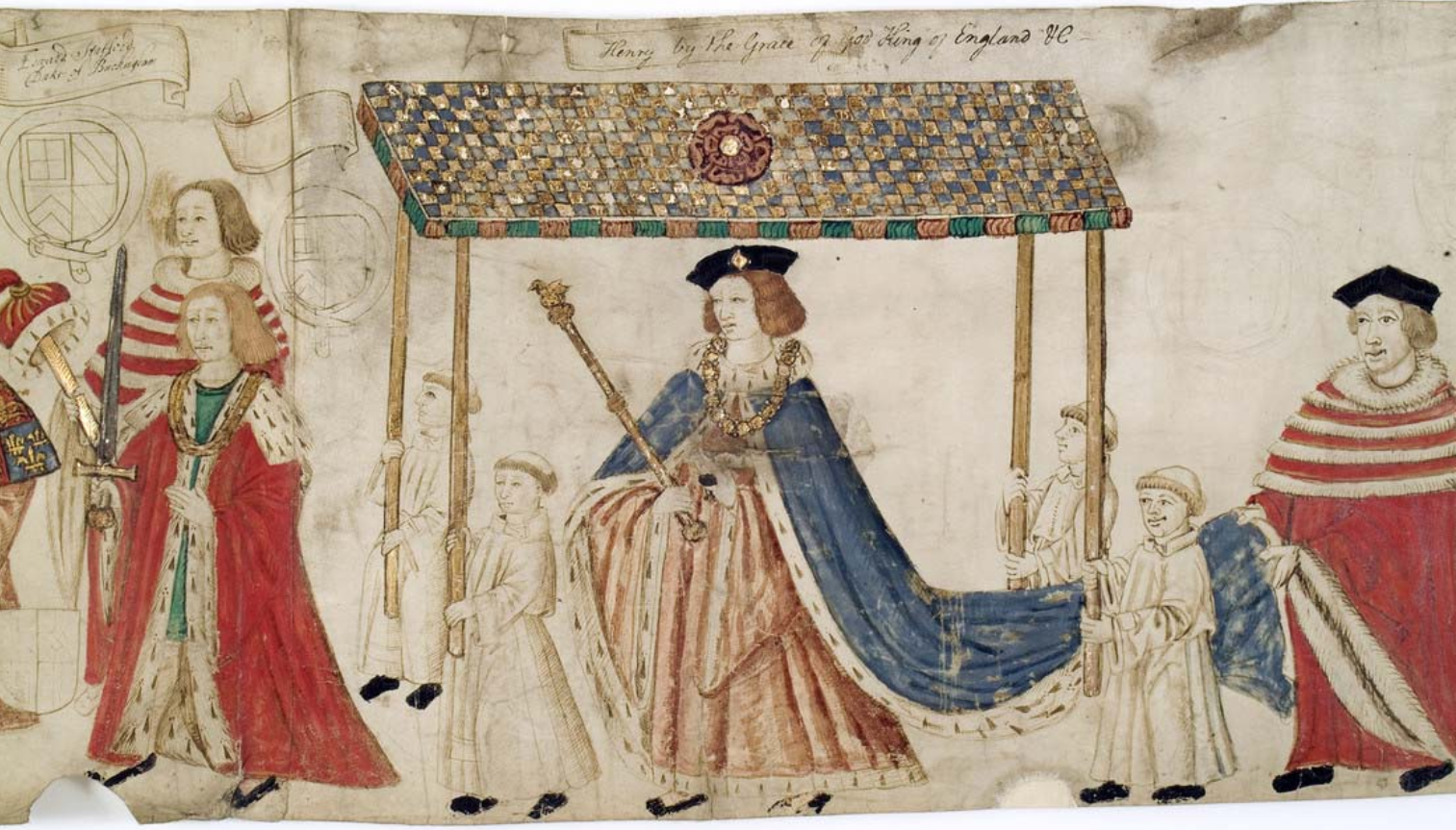
Henry VIII going to open Parliament (contemporary illustration: part of The Procession of Parliament 1512, a 18 ft (5.5 m) long vellum parchment roll).

=== Origins ===
The Opening of Parliament began out of practical necessity. By the late 14th century, the manner in which the King gathered his nobles and representatives of the Commons had begun to follow an established pattern. First of all, Peers' names were checked against the list of those who had been summoned, and representatives of the Commons were checked against the sheriffs' election returns. The Peers were robed and sat in the Painted Chamber at the Palace of Westminster; the Commons were summoned, and stood at the Bar (threshold) of the Chamber. A speech or sermon was then given (usually by the Lord Chancellor) explaining why Parliament had been summoned, after which the Lords and Commons went separately to discuss the business in hand. The monarch normally presided, not only for the Opening but also for the deliberations which followed (unless prevented by illness or other pressing matters); the Painted Chamber was one of the monarch's private apartments.

=== The Tudors ===
In the Tudor period, the modern structure of Parliament began to emerge, and the monarch no longer attended during normal proceedings. For this reason, the State Opening took on greater symbolic significance as an occasion for the full constitution of the State (Monarch, Lords and Commons) to be seen. In this period, the parliamentary gathering began to be preceded by an open-air State Procession (which often attracted large numbers of onlookers): the Monarch, together with Household retinue, would proceed in State from whichever royal residence was being used, first to Westminster Abbey for a service (usually a Mass of the Holy Ghost, prior to the Reformation), and thence on foot (accompanied by the Lords Spiritual and Temporal in their robes) to the Palace of Westminster for the Opening itself.

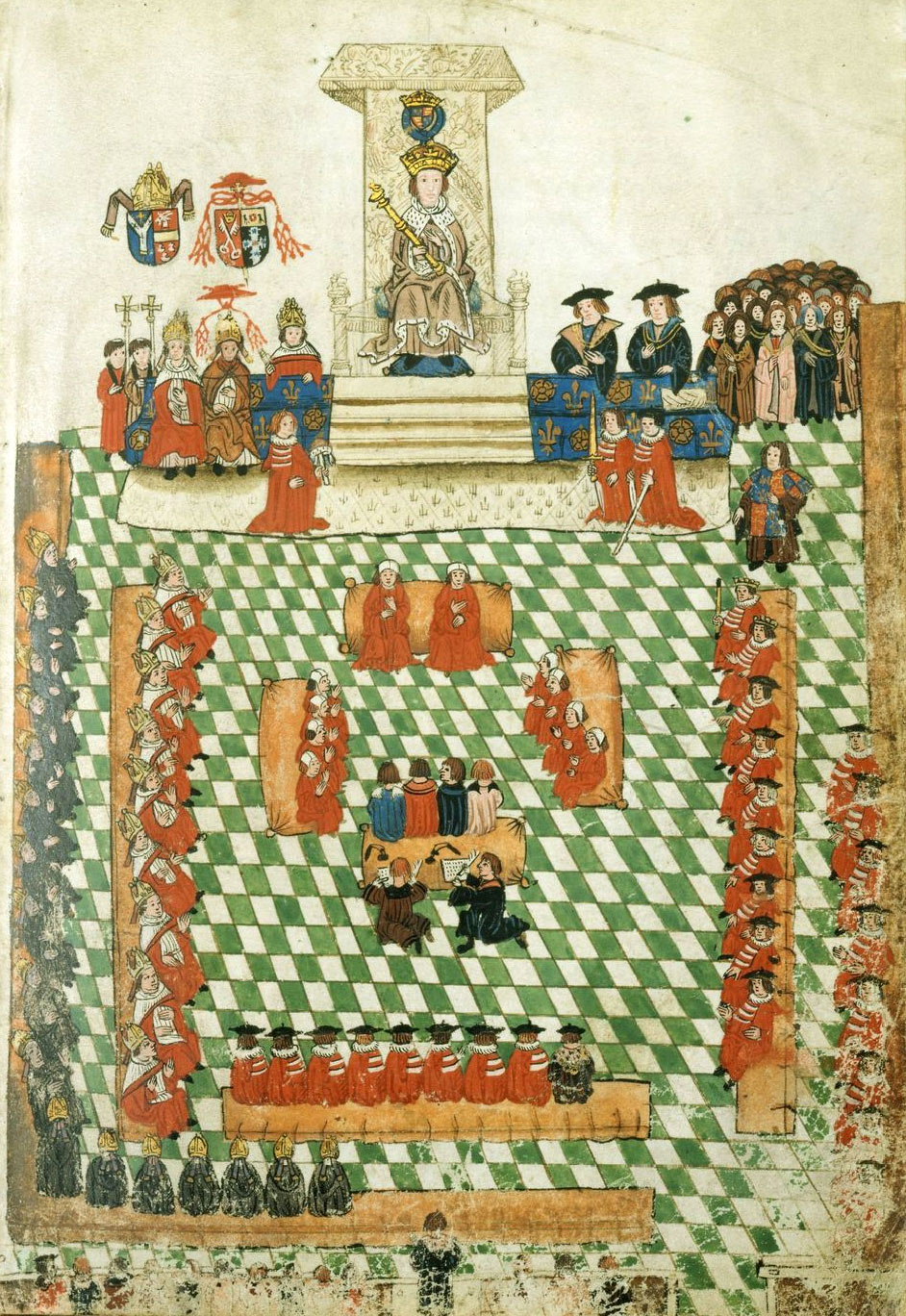
Opening of Parliament by Henry VIII at Bridewell in 1523; a contemporary illustration from the Wriothesley Garter Book

The Wriothesley Garter Book, a 1523 illustration by Thomas Wriothesley, depicts King Henry VIII seated in Parliament in that year. It shows a remarkable visual similarity between State Openings of the 16th and 21st centuries. In both cases, the monarch sits on a throne before the Cloth of Estate, crowned and wearing a crimson robe of state; at his right hand sit Cardinal Thomas Wolsey, Archbishop of York and Lord Chancellor, with arms above under a cardinal's hat, and William Warham, Archbishop of Canterbury, with arms above. Behind stands Cuthbert Tunstall, Bishop of London and Lord Keeper of the Privy Seal. The Cap of Maintenance and Sword of State are borne by peers standing before the monarch on the left and right respectively; the Lord Great Chamberlain stands alongside, bearing his white wand of office, near the Garter King of Arms in his tabard displaying the royal arms (Thomas Wriothesley himself, the illustrator). Members of the Royal retinue are arrayed behind the King (top right). In the main body of the Chamber, the Bishops are seated on benches to the King's right wearing their parliamentary robes, with the Mitred Abbots behind them. (Note: The Mitred Abbots were removed from Parliament at the time of the Reformation.) The Lords Temporal are seated to the King's left and on the cross-bench, the status of peers is indicated by the number of miniver bars (white fur edged with gold oak-leaf lace) on their peerage robes: 4 for a duke, 3½ for a marquess, 3 for an earl, 2½ for a viscount, and 2 for a baron. Thus there are 2 dukes, both wearing ducal coronets, the first holding a Marshal's Baton, thus he is the Duke of Norfolk, Earl Marshal of England. William Weston, Prior of the Hospital of St John of Jerusalem, premier baron in the roll of peers, dressed in black, sits at the end of the cross-bench. The judges (red-robed and coifed) are on the woolsacks in the centre (two Chief Justices, eight judges, and four Serjeants-at-Law), and behind them kneel the clerks (with quills and inkpots). At the bottom of the picture members of the House of Commons can be seen behind the Bar of the House, with Thomas More, Speaker of the House of Commons, in the centre, wearing his black and gold robe of state.

The Palace of Westminster ceased to be a royal residence following a fire in 1512. Afterwards another of the King's residences was on occasion used (in 1523, for instance, the State Opening took place at Bridewell Palace, and the Mass beforehand at Blackfriars Priory). When (in 1530) the King moved into the Palace at Whitehall, however, the ceremony returned to Westminster. In 1536, the State Opening was held for the first time in the White Chamber of the Palace of Westminster, which is where the House of Lords sat; and so began the custom of the State Opening taking place in the Upper House of Parliament.

=== Subsequent developments ===
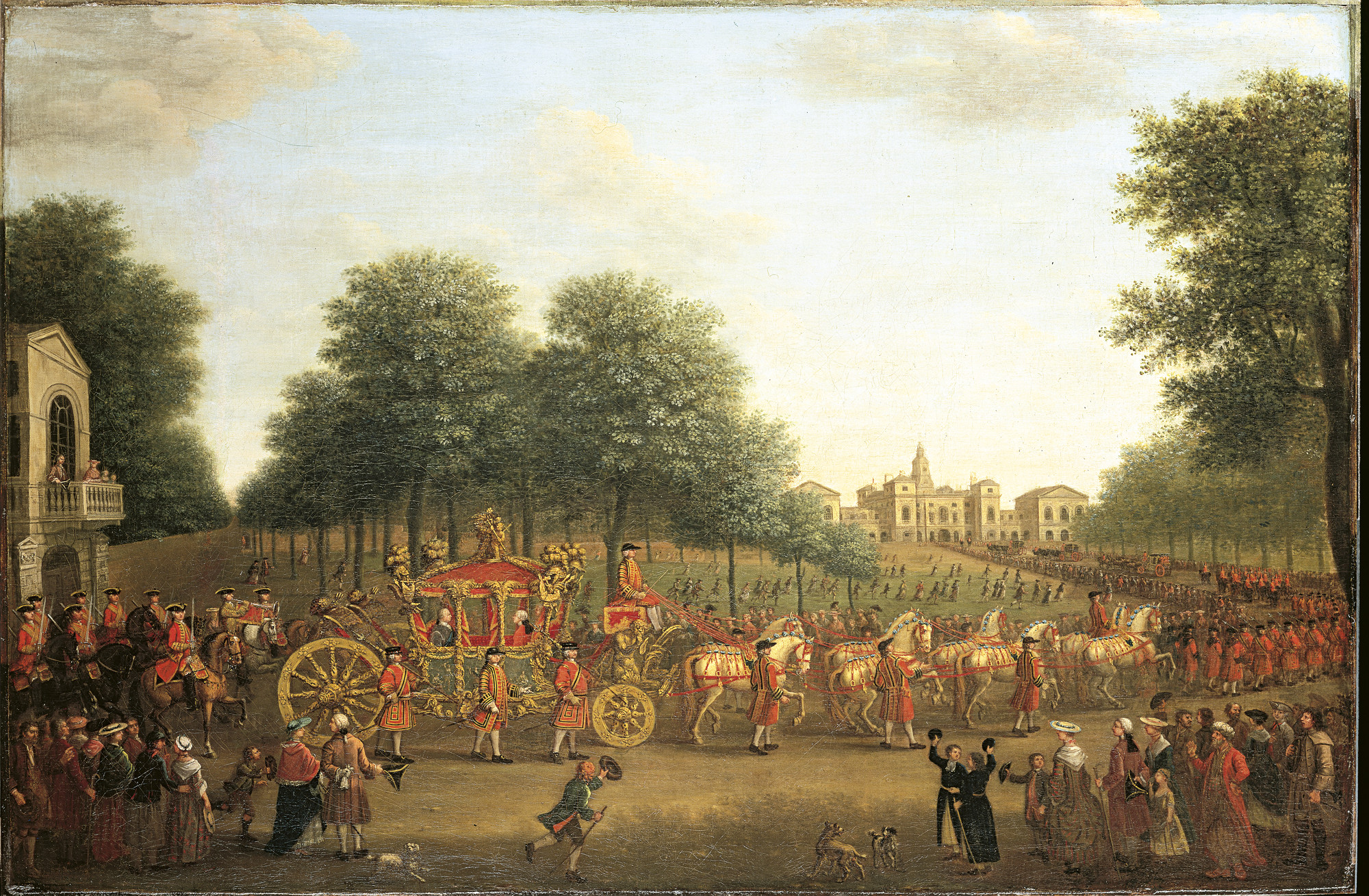
George III travelling to the State Opening of Parliament in the Gold State Coach, 1762. The route, as today, goes via Horse Guards (right).

Since that time the ceremonial has evolved, but not dramatically. In 1679 neither the procession nor the Abbey service took place due to the Popish Plot conspiracy theory; although the procession was subsequently restored, the service in the Abbey was not. The monarch's role in the proceedings changed over time: early on, the monarch would say some introductory words, before calling upon the Lord Chancellor (or Lord Keeper) to address the assembly. James I, however, was accustomed to speak at greater length himself, and sometimes dispensed with the Chancellor's services as spokesman. This varying pattern continued in subsequent reigns (and during the Commonwealth, when Cromwell gave the speech), but from 1679 onwards it became the norm for the monarch alone to speak. Since then, the monarch (if present) has almost invariably given the speech, with the exception of George I (whose command of English was poor) and Victoria (after the death of Prince Albert). During the Regency of 1811–1820, the Prince of Wales attended in full state and gave a Prince Regent's Speech.

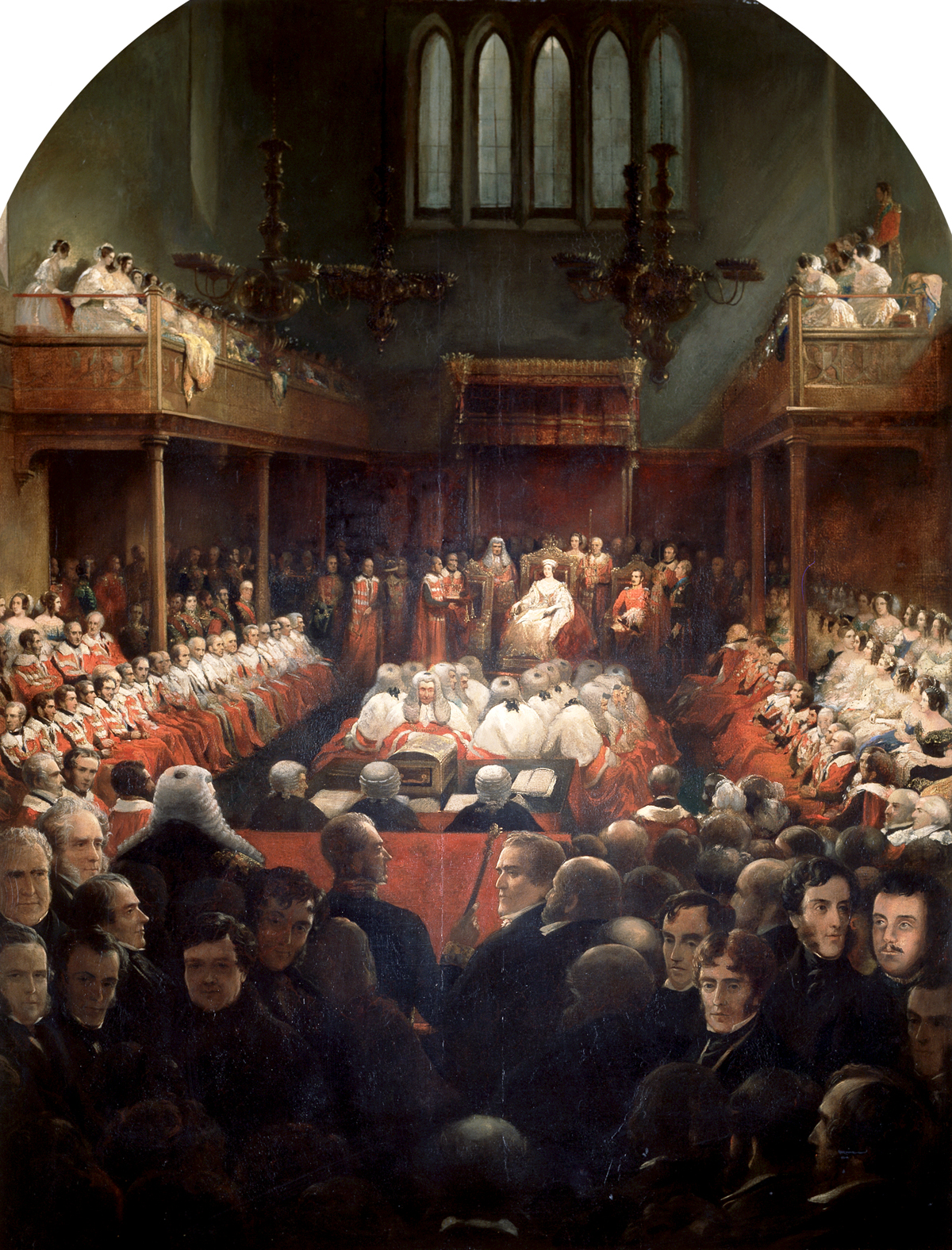
Queen Victoria Opening Parliament in the Painted Chamber, 1845.

A dramatic change was occasioned by the destruction of the old Palace of Westminster by fire in 1834. After that, the Painted Chamber (which had been gutted in the blaze) was roofed over and fitted up to serve as a temporary house of Lords, pending the rebuilding of the palace; the State Opening took place there until 1847, when the new Lords' chamber was opened.

The new palace was designed with the ceremony of the State Opening very much in mind; the choreography of the modern ceremony may be said to date from 1852, when the "Victoria Tower entrance" was used for the first time, and likewise "the Royal Staircase, Norman Porch, new Robing Room and Royal Gallery", establishing the modern processional route.

Between 1837 and 1861, Queen Victoria missed the State Opening on only four occasions (each time due to pregnancy); but following the death of the Prince Consort she avoided ceremonial events. She attended the State Opening in 1866 wearing a black dress and veil rather than the robe of state (which was instead draped over the throne); on this occasion she delegated the reading of the speech to the Lord Chancellor. Victoria attended the State Opening on six further occasions (in the 1870s-80s), wearing a small diamond crown in place of the Imperial State Crown; but otherwise delegated the opening of Parliament to Lords Commissioners (one of whom was usually the Prince of Wales). It was not until the latter's accession as Edward VII in 1901 that the full state ceremonial of the event was restored (with the king being in regular attendance and reading the speech himself). King George V resumed wearing the Imperial State Crown in 1913.

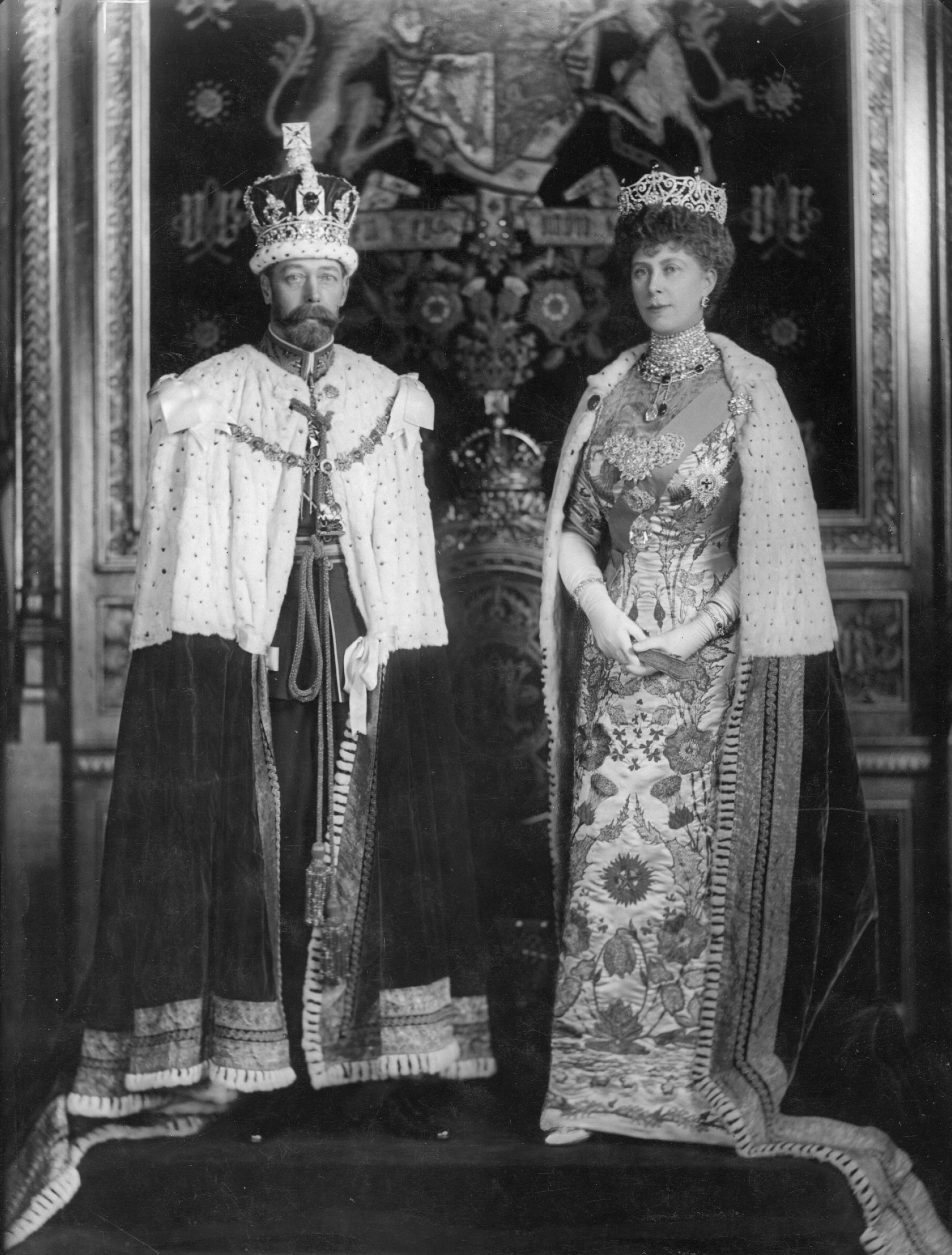
King George V and Queen Mary photographed in the Robing Room, ready for the State Opening of Parliament.

During the two world wars the ceremonial was reduced, and by necessity modified: for example, in 1940 the entire State Opening took place in Church House, Westminster for reasons of security; and then from 1941 to 1944 it took place in the Robing Room, which was serving as a temporary chamber for the Lords while theirs was in use by the Commons (whose chamber had been destroyed in the Blitz). Full ceremonial was restored for the most part in 1948, with the crown and robes returning two years later (once the Lords had vacated the Robing Room).

Queen Elizabeth II opened every session of Parliament during her reign, except in 1959, 1963, and 2022. In 1959 and 1963, she was pregnant with Prince Andrew and Prince Edward respectively and those two sessions were opened by Lords Commissioners, headed by the Archbishop of Canterbury (Geoffrey Fisher in 1959 and Michael Ramsey in 1963), empowered by the Queen. (Note: The Lord Chancellor (Viscount Kilmuir in 1959 and Lord Dilhorne in 1963) read the Queen's Speech on those occasions.) The Queen also missed the 2022 State Opening on the advice of her doctors. That session was opened by her son Charles, Prince of Wales and her grandson Prince William, Duke of Cambridge who, in their capacity as Counsellors of State, were empowered to do so by Letters Patent issued by the Queen for the occasion, the Prince of Wales reading the Queen's Speech (from the consort's throne) on behalf of his mother.

In 1958, the entire State Opening of Parliament was filmed and televised for the first time. In 1998, minor adjustments were made to the ceremonial inside Parliament with a view to shortening the proceedings. (Note: Some of the modifications were subsequently reversed, e.g. the separation of the heralds from the main procession (which had in fact had the effect of lengthening rather than shortening the proceedings).)

In the 1998 Queen's Speech, Elizabeth II faced an unprecedented outburst when she outlined the government's plan to ban most hereditary peers from sitting in the House of Lords. The Queen's Speech was interrupted by shouts of "hear hear" from Labour MPs, and some peers appeared to respond to the interruption with "shame". This was regarded as a considerable act of discourtesy, and the first time in living memory that the sovereign's address, which is normally listened to in total silence, had been interrupted.

== Equivalents in other countries ==
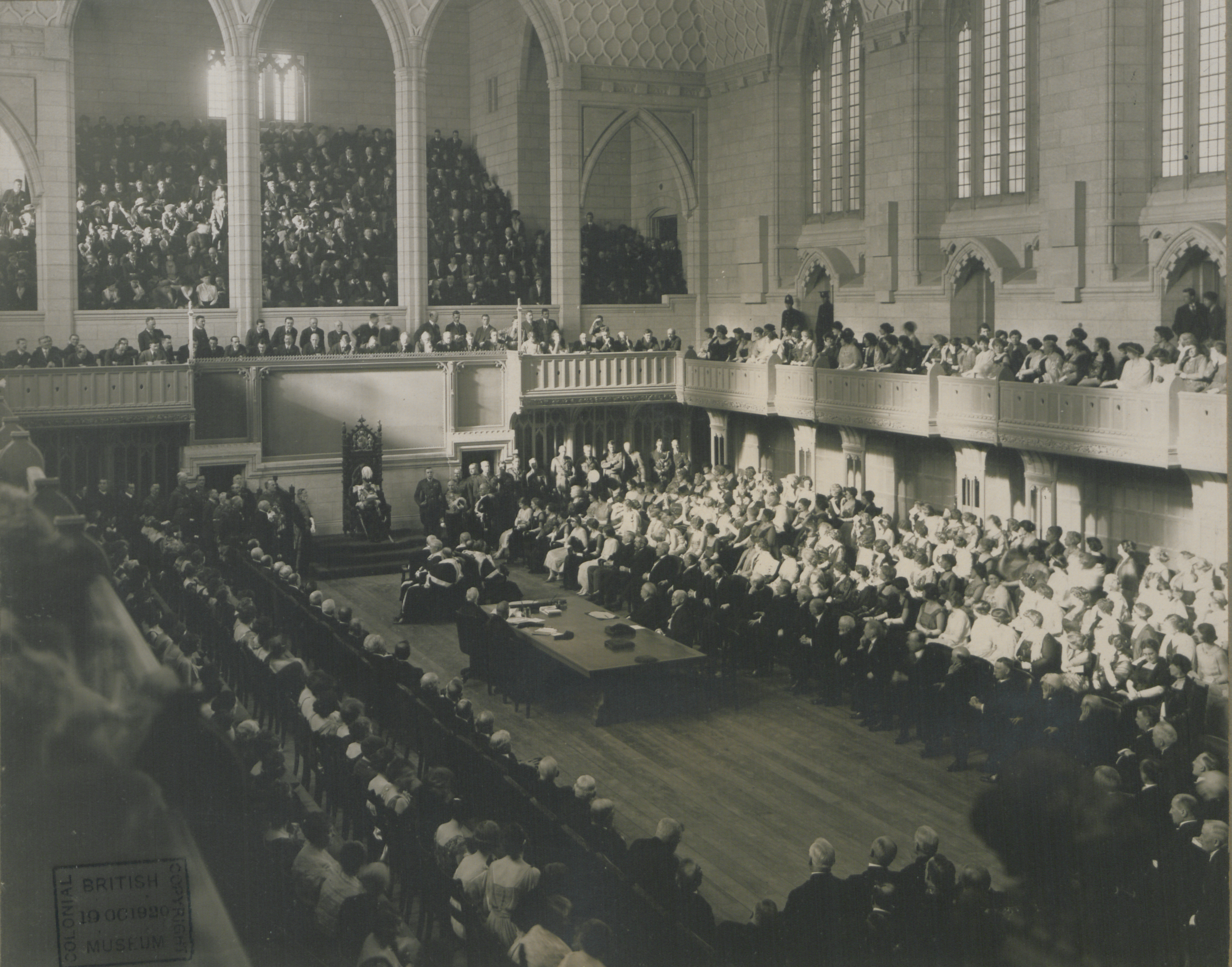
The opening of the Parliament of Canada in 1920.

In addition to the UK, Opening of Parliament ceremonies are held in other Commonwealth realms. The governor-general or, in the case of Australia's states and Canada's provinces, the relevant governor or lieutenant governor, respectively, usually delivers the speech from the throne. On occasion, the monarch may open these parliaments and deliver the speech him or herself. In Canada, King Charles III delivered the speech on 27 May 2025, for the first time since Queen Elizabeth II delivered one in 1977. In Australia, the last time a reigning monarch delivered the speech in person was March 1977. In New Zealand, the monarch last opened parliament personally in February 1990.

In Spain the Solemn Opening of the Parliament of Spain is conducted by the monarch.

In Malaysia, the Parliament of Malaysia also conducts an annual State Opening, usually in March, presided over by the Yang di-Pertuan Agong. However, parliament is opened in the lower house (the Dewan Rakyat) rather than the upper house (the Dewan Negara), thus the sitting is conducted by its Speaker. Additionally, as there is no equivalent to the Lord Chancellor, the speech is presented to the Monarch by the Prime Minister.

In India, the President of India opens Parliament with an address similar to the Speech from the Throne. This is also the case in Commonwealth Republics with a non-executive Presidency such as Malta, Mauritius and Singapore.

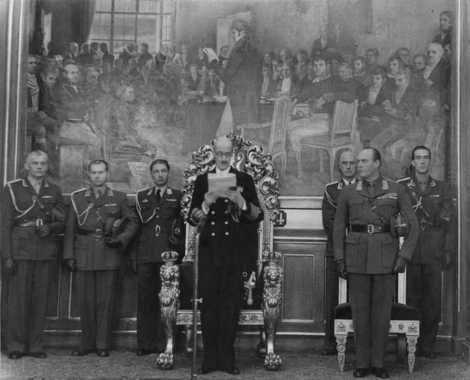
King Haakon VII delivering the Speech from the Throne in Stortinget in 1950.

In the Netherlands a similar ceremony is held on the third Tuesday in September, which is called Prinsjesdag in the Netherlands. Article 65 of the constitution states that "A statement of the policy to be pursued by the Government is given by or on behalf of the King before a joint session of the two Houses of the States General that is held every year on the third Tuesday in September or on such earlier date as may be prescribed by Act of Parliament." In Norway, the King is required by Article 74 of the constitution to preside over the opening of the Storting after it had been declared to be legally constituted by the president of the Storting. After he delivers the Speech from the Throne, outlining the government's policies for the coming year, a member of the government reads the Report on the State of the Realm, an account of the government's achievements of the past year.

In Sweden a similar ceremony as the British was held until 1974, when the constitution was changed. The old opening of state was in Sweden called Riksdagens högtidliga öppnande ("The solemn opening of the Riksdag") and was, as the British, full of symbolism. After the abolition of the old state opening, the opening is now held in the Riksdag but in the presence of the monarch and his family. It is still the King who officially opens the parliament. After the opening of parliament the King gives a speech followed by the Prime Minister's declaration of government.

In Israel, a semi-annual ceremony, attended by the President, opens the winter and summer sessions of the Knesset. Though in the past he was a guest sitting in the Knesset's upper deck, the President now attends the ceremony from the speaker's podium and gives his own written address regarding the upcoming session. In the first session of each legislative period of the Knesset, the President has the duty of opening the first session himself and inaugurating the temporary Knesset speaker, and then conducting the inauguration process of all of the Knesset members.

In some countries with presidential or similar systems in which the roles of head of state and head of government are merged, the chief executive's annual speech to the legislative branch is imbued with some of the ceremonial weight of a parliamentary state opening. The most well-known example is the State of the Union Address in the United States. Other examples include the State of the Nation Address in the Philippines, a former American dependency. These speeches differ from a State Opening in at least two respects, however: they do not in fact open the legislative session, and they are delivered by the chief executive on his or her own behalf. In Poland, the President of Poland delivers his speech to the Sejm and the Senate at the First Sitting of these Houses, which is similar to Speech from the Throne. It is rather a custom than a law. Most Presidents of Poland delivered the Speech to the Parliament. The exception was in 2007, when President Lech Kaczyński, instead of addressing the Sejm, watched the First Sitting of the 6th term Sejm from the Presidential box in the Press gallery. The President of Mexico used to be constitutionally obliged to deliver a speech, similar to the American State of the Union, until 2006 when President Vicente Fox was impeded by the opposition parties from entering the Congress building for his sixth and final speech. Since that incident, the Constitution no longer requires the President's presence at the opening of Congress.
