= 2026 State Opening of Parliament =

Start of session of UK Parliament

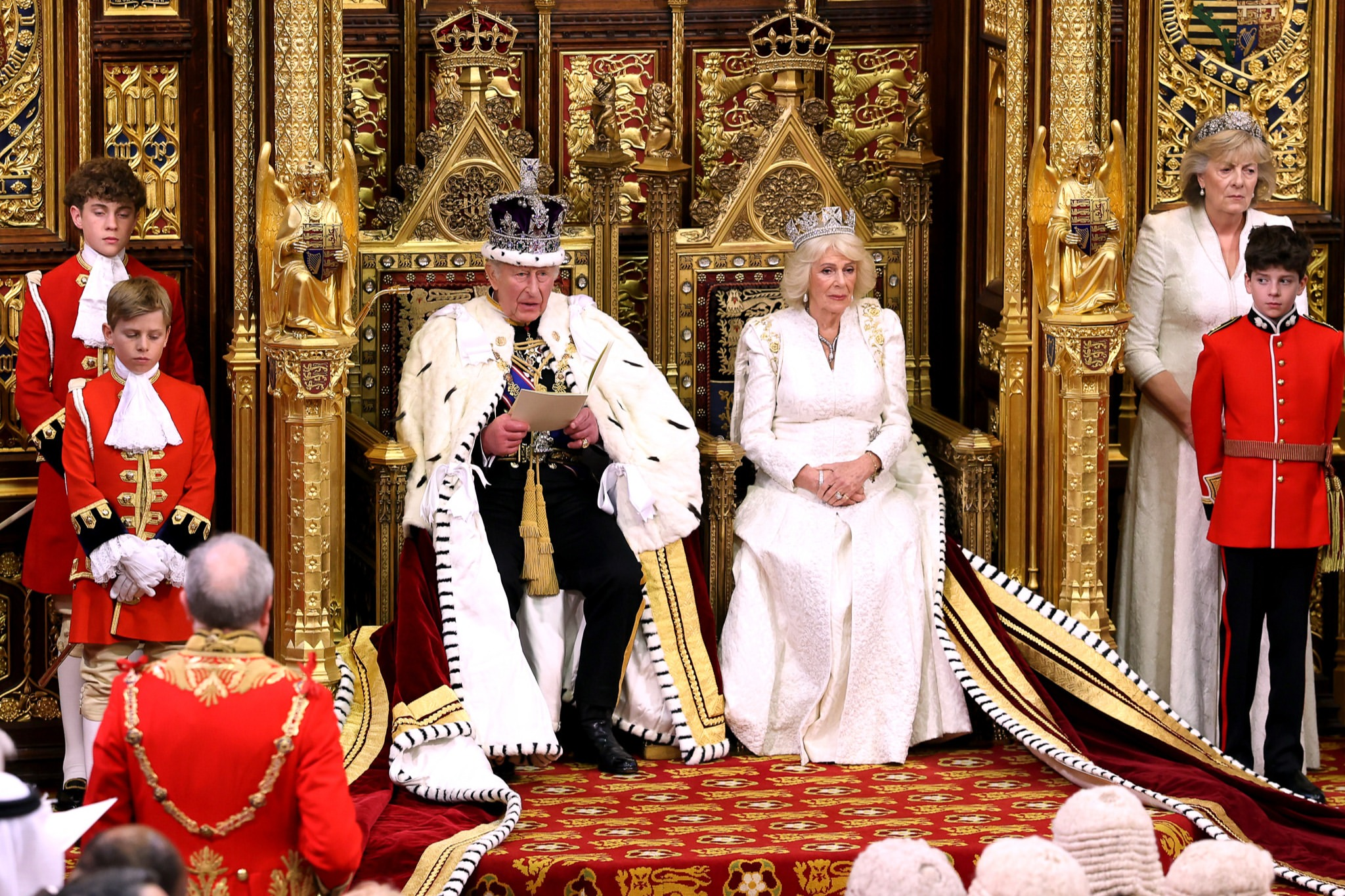
- King Charles III and Queen Camilla sitting in the House of Lords
- Legislative body: Parliament of the United Kingdom
- Meeting place: Palace of Westminster
- Date: 13 May 2026
- Government: Starmer Ministry

A State Opening of the Parliament of the United Kingdom took place on 13 May 2026, when the monarch opened the second session of the Parliament elected at the 2024 general election to start the new session. The chosen date was in the week after the 2026 United Kingdom local elections. The speech was made in the House of Lords at just after 11.30am.

It was the first State Opening of Parliament for Ed Davis as Black Rod.

== Background ==
On 26 March 2026, the date for the speech was set for 13 May. On 8 May 2026, following the local elections, it was confirmed that there would be a State Opening of Parliament the following week. The prime minister's leadership has been reportedly damaged following the elections and the speech intends to refocus the government's agenda. BBC News speculated that new laws on EU alignment and tourist tax could be included in the speech. The speech was held at a point of leadership crisis.

The King's Speech outlined the government's legislative programme for the 2026–27 parliamentary session, with 37 bills announced. Major proposals included legislation to strengthen economic growth, tackle threats from hostile state actors, reform energy security, and lower the voting age to 16.

== Preparation ==
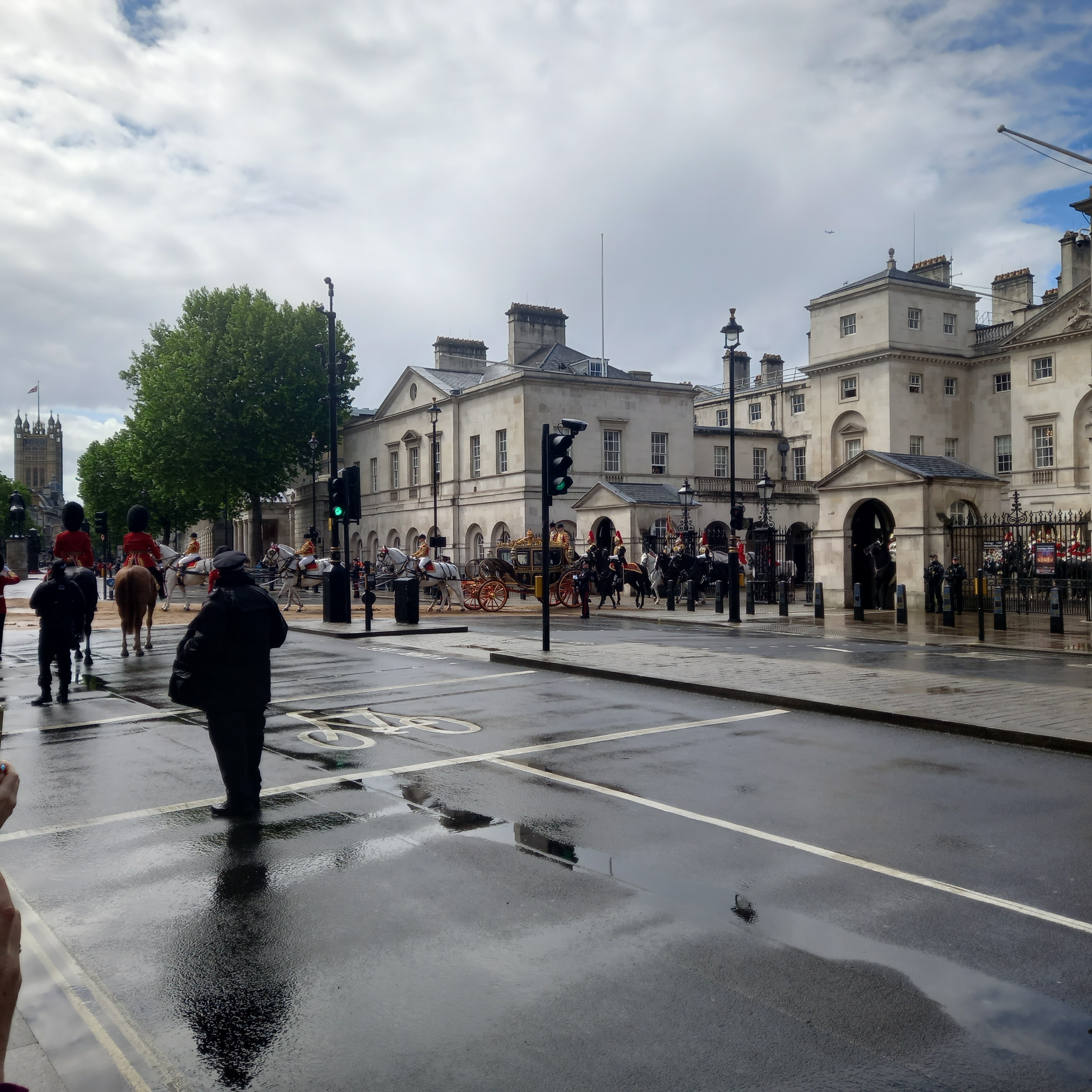
The King and Queen in the Irish State Coach process in state through Horse Guards into Whitehall.

In the morning of 13 May, Nic Dakin, Vice-Chamberlain of the Household, was "taken hostage", as is tradition. King Charles III wore his Admiral of the Fleet Royal Naval Number 1 Dress with cap and sword, while Queen Camilla wore the State Diadem worn by every queen consort since Queen Adelaide.

The King and Queen were accompanied by a Sovereign's Escort of the Household Cavalry as they travelled in the Irish State Coach from Buckingham Palace to the House of Lords. A separate coach carried the royal regalia – the Imperial State Crown, the cap of maintenance and sword of state – to Westminster.

== Legislative programme ==
The King's Speech included 37 pieces of legislation that Labour hoped to pass during the next parliamentary session. Policy areas include digital ID and northern rail.

The legislation includes:

=== New bills ===
- European Partnership Bill
- Small Business Protections (Late Payments) Bill
- Clean Water Bill
- Competition Reform Bill
- Regulating for Growth Bill
- Enhancing Financial Services Bill
- Steel Industry (Nationalisation) Bill
- Northern Powerhouse Rail Bill
- Highways (Financing) Bill
- Overnight Visitor Levy Bill
- Social Housing Renewal Bill
- Commonhold and Leasehold Reform Bill
- Education for All Bill
- Remediation Bill
- Sporting Events Bill
- Police Reform Bill
- NHS Modernisation Bill
- Digital Access to Services Bill
- Removal of Peerages Bill
- Civil Aviation Bill
- Sovereign Grant Bill
- Immigration and Asylum Bill
- Energy Independence Bill
- Nuclear Regulation Bill
- Electricity Generator Levy Bill
- Tackling State Threats Bill
- National Security Bill

=== Draft bills ===
- Conversion Practices Bill
- Ticket Tout Ban Bill
- Taxi and Private Hire Vehicle Bill

=== Carry-over bills ===
- Armed Forces Bill
- Courts and Tribunals Bill
- Cyber Security and Resilience Bill
- Northern Ireland Troubles Bill
- Public Office (Accountability) Bill
- Railways and Passenger Benefits Bill
- Representation of the People Bill
