= 2022 State Opening of Parliament =

Start of session of UK Parliament

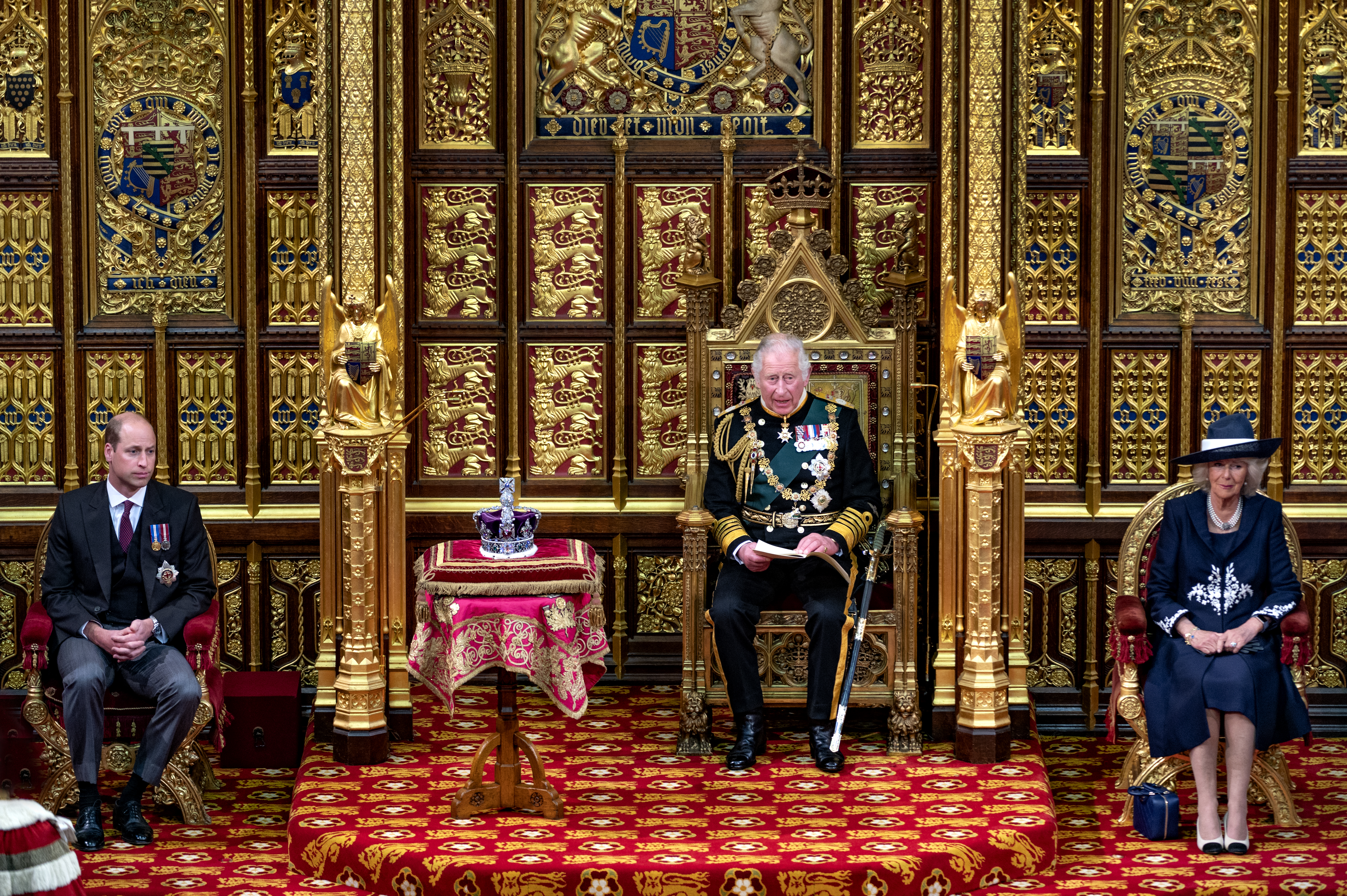
- The Prince of Wales reading the Queen's Speech
- Legislative body: Parliament of the United Kingdom
- Meeting place: Palace of Westminster
- Date: 10 May 2022
- Government: Second Johnson ministry

A State Opening of the Parliament of the United Kingdom took place on 10 May 2022. Charles, Prince of Wales, and Prince William, Duke of Cambridge, opened the third session of the 58th Parliament on behalf of Queen Elizabeth II with the traditional Queen's Speech. It was the first State Opening at which two Counsellors of State acted on behalf of the monarch.

On 6 May, BBC News reported that the Queen was hoping to attend. On 9 May, it was reported that the Queen would not be attending. Instead, her son, the then-Prince of Wales, and her grandson, the Duke of Cambridge opened a new session of the British Parliament on behalf of the Queen, acting as Counsellors of State, with Prince Charles reading the Queen's speech. This would be the final State Opening of the Queen's reign before her death in September 2022.

== Ceremony ==
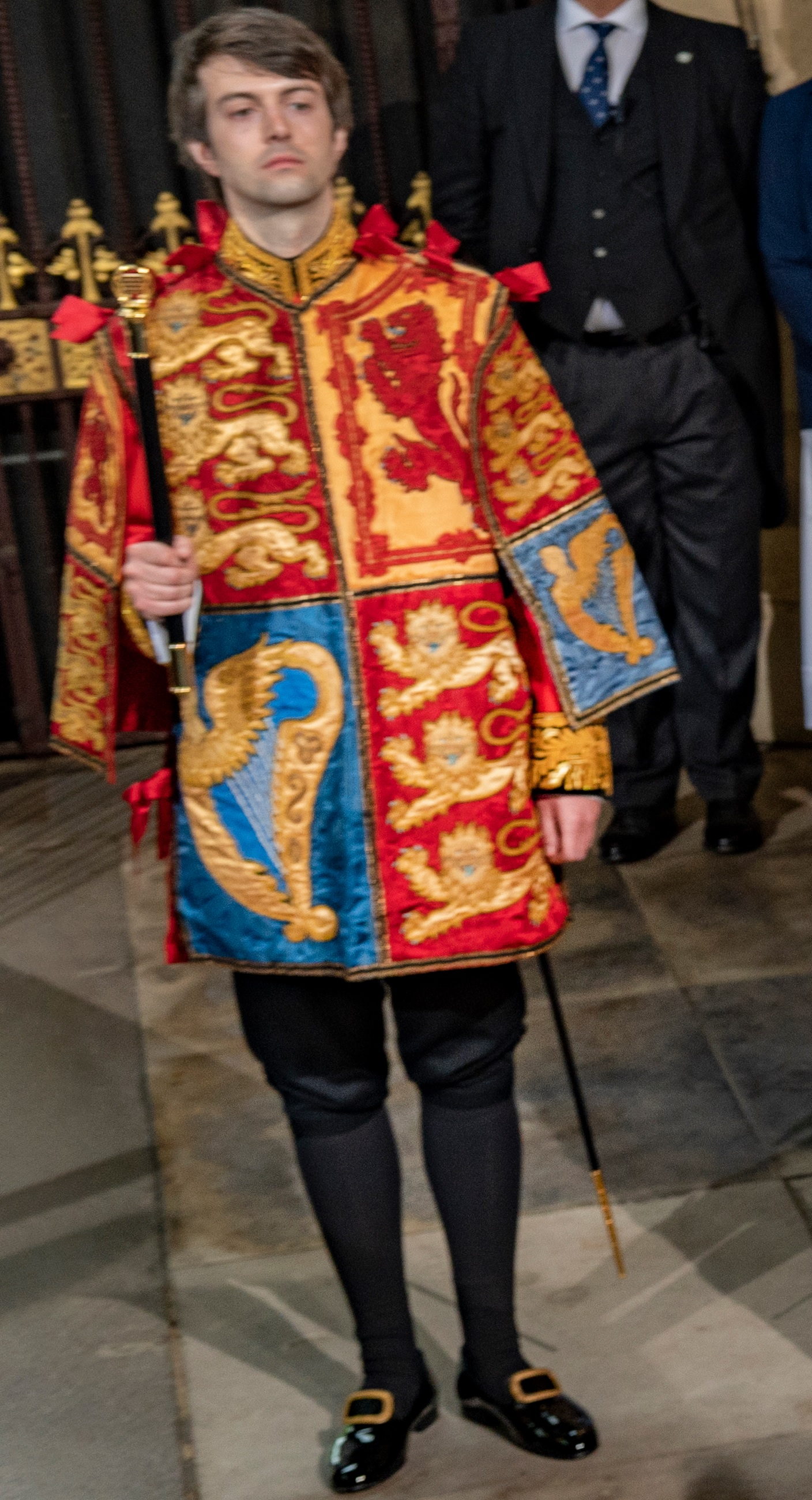
Dominic Ingram, in his tabard as Portcullis Pursuivant at the state opening.

On the morning of the event, James Morris MP, as Vice-Chamberlain of the Household, was "taken hostage" at Buckingham Palace to ensure Prince Charles' and Prince William's safe return from Parliament.

The Prince of Wales, wearing the uniform of an Admiral of the Fleet, read the Queen's Speech from the consort's throne that was formerly used by his late father, Prince Philip, Duke of Edinburgh. The larger Sovereign's Throne that was normally used by the Queen was removed from the chamber. The Duke of Cambridge and Camilla, Duchess of Cornwall, both wearing morning dress with the Duke of Cambridge wearing his military medals and the breast star of the Order of the Garter, sat in chairs of state on either side of the Prince of Wales.

Rather than the traditional command to the House of Commons, Black Rod summoned the MPs by saying: "Mr. Speaker, the Queen commands this Honourable House, to attend her Counsellors of State immediately in the House of Peers". In addition, the Prince of Wales referred to the government and ministers as "Her Majesty's Government" and "Her Majesty's Ministers". This was in place of the traditional "My Government" and "My Ministers" used by the Queen.

== Bills ==
A number of bills were carried over from the previous session.

- Animal Welfare (Kept Animals) Bill
- High Speed Rail (Crewe-Manchester) Bill
- Higher Education (Freedom of Speech) Bill
- Online Safety Bill
- Product Security and Telecommunications Infrastructure Bill
