= Queen Alexandra's State Coach =

British royal carriage

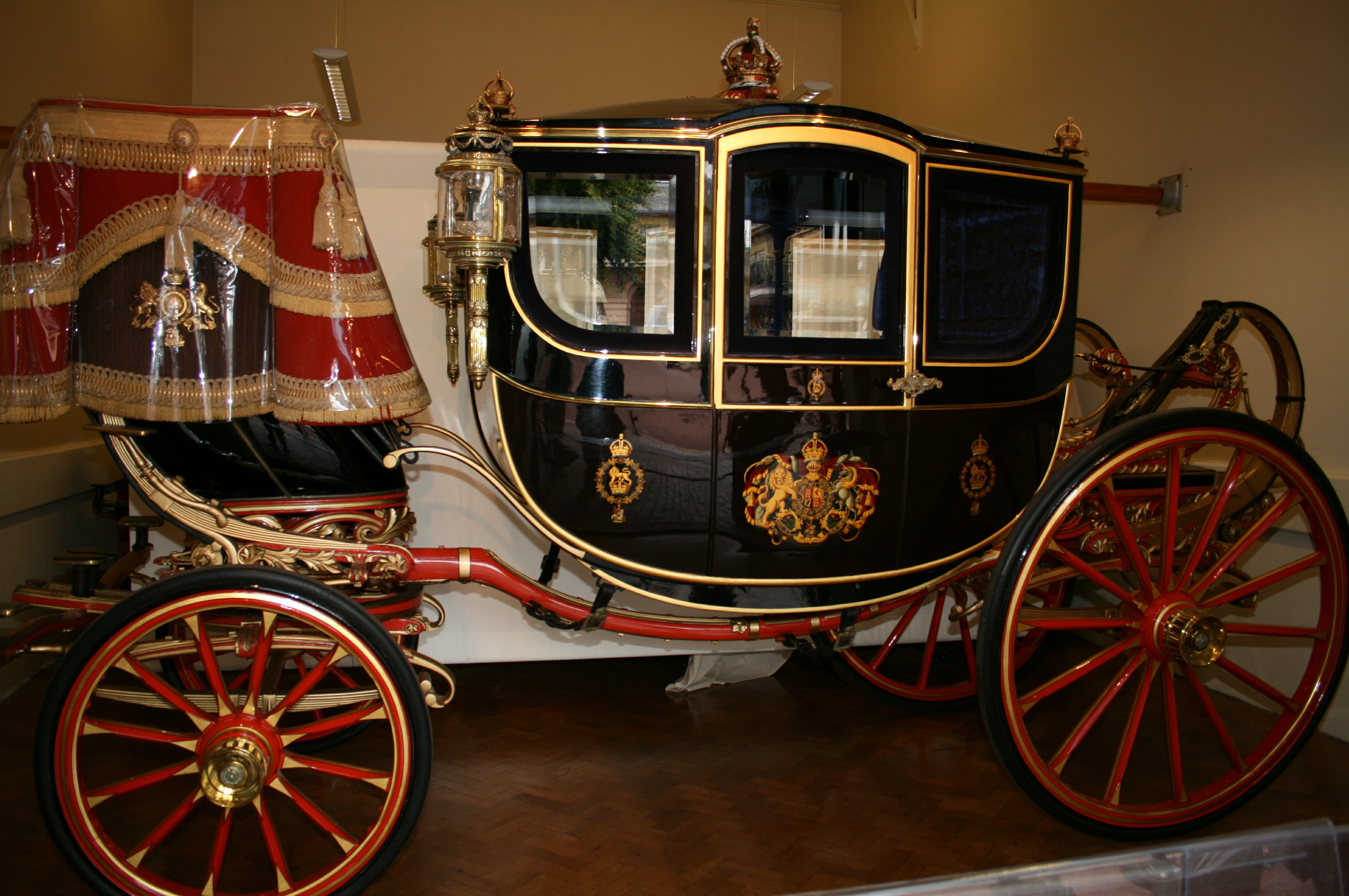
Queen Alexandra's State Coach on display at the Royal Mews in 2007

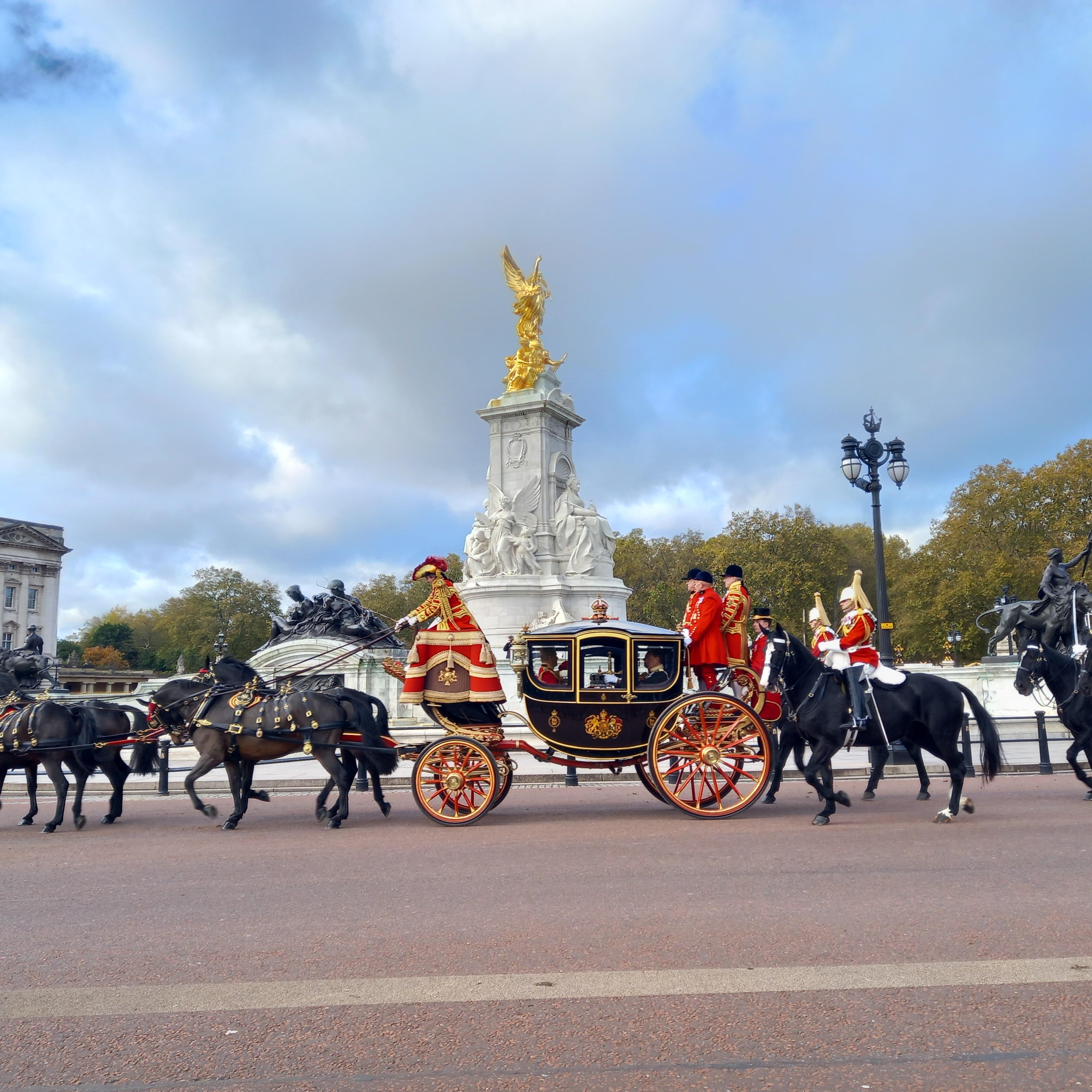
The coach conveying the Crown and other insignia from the Palace of Westminster following the 2023 State Opening of Parliament

Queen Alexandra's State Coach is one of several state carriages maintained at the Royal Mews, Buckingham Palace. It was built around the year 1865, initially as a plain "town coach". Some 30 years later it was glazed and converted into a State Coach for the use of the Princess of Wales (later Queen) Alexandra.

It is usually driven four-in-hand by a coachman. Like all the state coaches it has a variety of uses, but perhaps its best-known regular duty is to convey the Imperial State Crown (together with the Sword of State, the Cap of Maintenance and their respective bearers) to and from the Palace of Westminster for the annual State Opening of Parliament. (In this instance it is always accompanied by The King's Bargemaster and Watermen acting as footmen, a reminder of the days when the Crown Jewels were invariably conveyed from the Tower of London on the River Thames for state occasions.) In transit, like the monarch, the crown and insignia are entitled to a Household Cavalry escort and receive a royal salute.

== See also ==
- List of state coaches
