= Royal Stables (Netherlands) =

Royal Stables (The Hague)

- Koninklijke Stallen
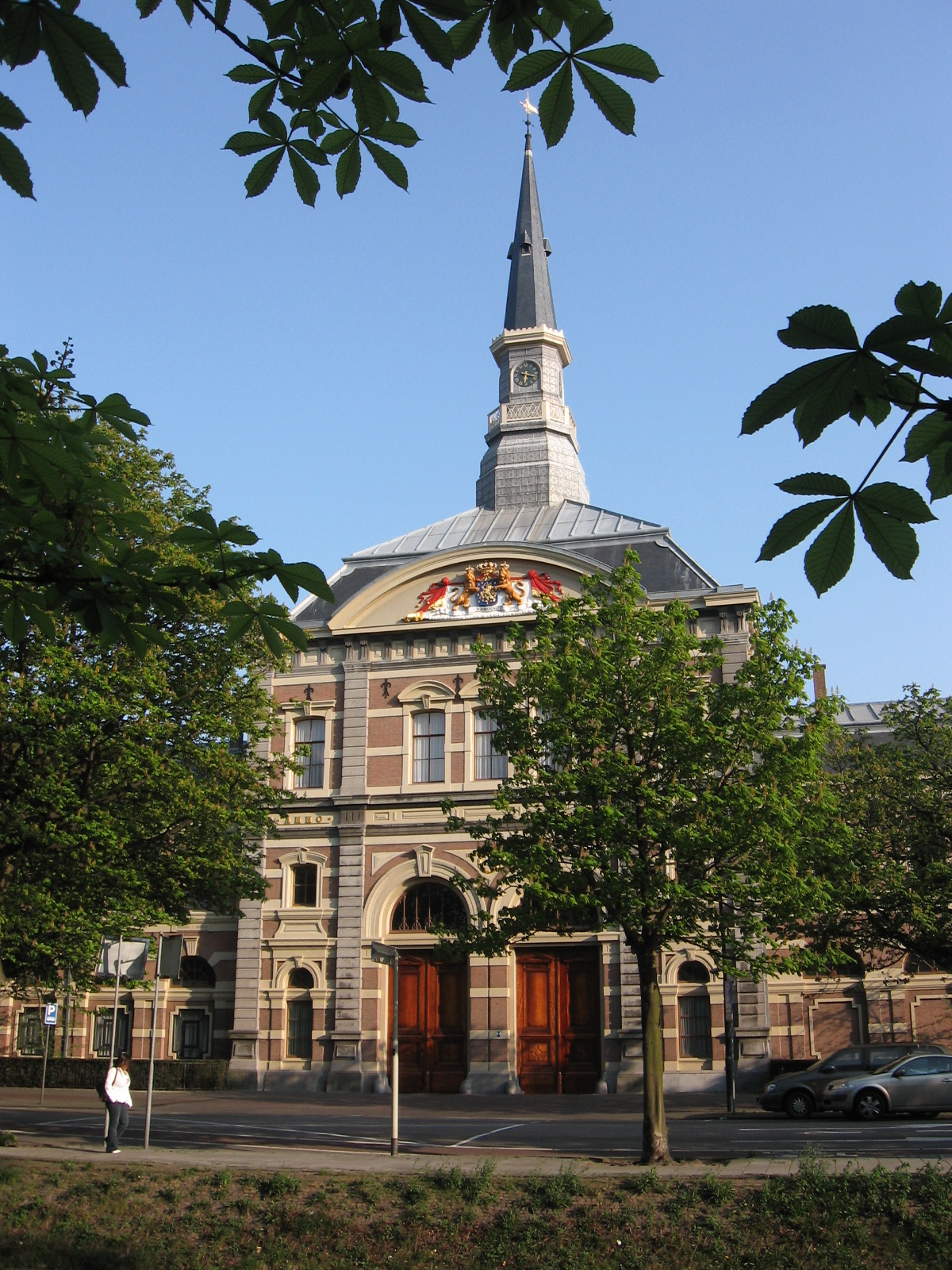
- Royal Stables (front facade)

General information
- Location: The Hague, Hogerwal 17, Netherlands
- Coordinates: 52.0828°N 4.3025°E
- Completed: 1876-1879
- Opened: 1881

Design and construction
- Architects: H.P. Vogel, L.H. Eberson and J.P.C. Swijser

The Royal Stables (Dutch: Koninklijke Stallen) is a collection of equestrian stables of the Dutch royal family, the House of Orange-Nassau. It is a Rijksmonumental building that is part of the royal palace grounds located in the city center of The Hague in the Netherlands. The Noordeinde Palace and the Palace Gardens are also part of this same palace complex. The Noordeinde Palace and its grounds are the official workplace of the Dutch King Willem-Alexander.

The organising organ working at the Royal Stables, the Crown Equerry (Dutch: Koninklijk Staldepartement), is responsible for the care of the transportation modes of the Dutch Royal House and Officers of the Royal Household.

== Building ==
The eclectic-renaissance building is designed by Dutch architect Hugo Pieter Vogel based on the older designs of L.H. Eberson and J.P.C. Swijser, and was built around 1876–1879.

The building consists of the horse stables, where the royal horses are residing. Furthermore, the personal horses of the royal family are residing in the Royal Stables building as well. There are indoor and outdoor horseback riding arenas to practice, and paddocks for the horses’ leisure time. Furthermore, several carriage houses are located in the building, which houses the Golden Coach and Glass Coach, among others. One part of the building holds a carriage exhibition with an extensive display of (historical) royal carriages and other associated items. The building is only open to the public during specific days of the year.

== Crown Equerry ==
The Stables is an official working part of the palace, where horses and people work on a daily basis, and where carriages and cars are in daily use supporting the work of the King as head of state. The Stables forms part of the Civil Household and is headed by the Crown Equerry, who is responsible for organising the royal procession for Prinsjesdag (the annual state opening of parliament) and other public occasions. Furthermore, the Crown Equerry is responsible for the transport of all members of the Royal House and Officers of the Royal Household. In these modern times, this means that the Crown Equerry cares for the royal limousines and the royal motor coach, as well as the royal horses, carriages, and coaches belonging to the Crown.

The Crown Equerry was established in 1815 by King William I. Since 1878, the Crown Equerry is located in the Royal Stables at the grounds of the Noordeinde Palace in the city center of The Hague.

== Royal Palace Stables ==
Apart from the Royal Stables at the palace grounds in The Hague, the Dutch Crown has several other equestrian stables and carriage houses located at the former royal residences in the Netherlands. The Soestdijk Palace, Het Loo Palace, and Drakensteyn Castle are equipped with such stables and carriage houses. However, these stables have been in private use by the palace residency, while the Royal Stables at Noordeinde Palace have been the working place of the Crown Equerry for the State since 1878.

These former palace stables are momentarily not in use by the family, as the royal family is residing at Huis ten Bosch in The Hague. These stables are transformed into a museum or event space, where the former stables and transportation modes of the royal family are exhibited.

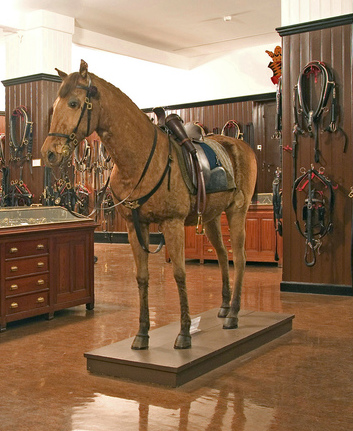
Wexy

== Trivia ==
- Wexy, the war horse of the then Prince of Orange, Prince Willem Frederik of Orange (later King William II), was ridden by him during the Battle of Waterloo. The horse was wounded during the battle, just like the Prince. After its death, the horse was mounted and is still one of the oldest preserved mounted horses in Europe, housed at the Royal Stables.

== Gallery ==
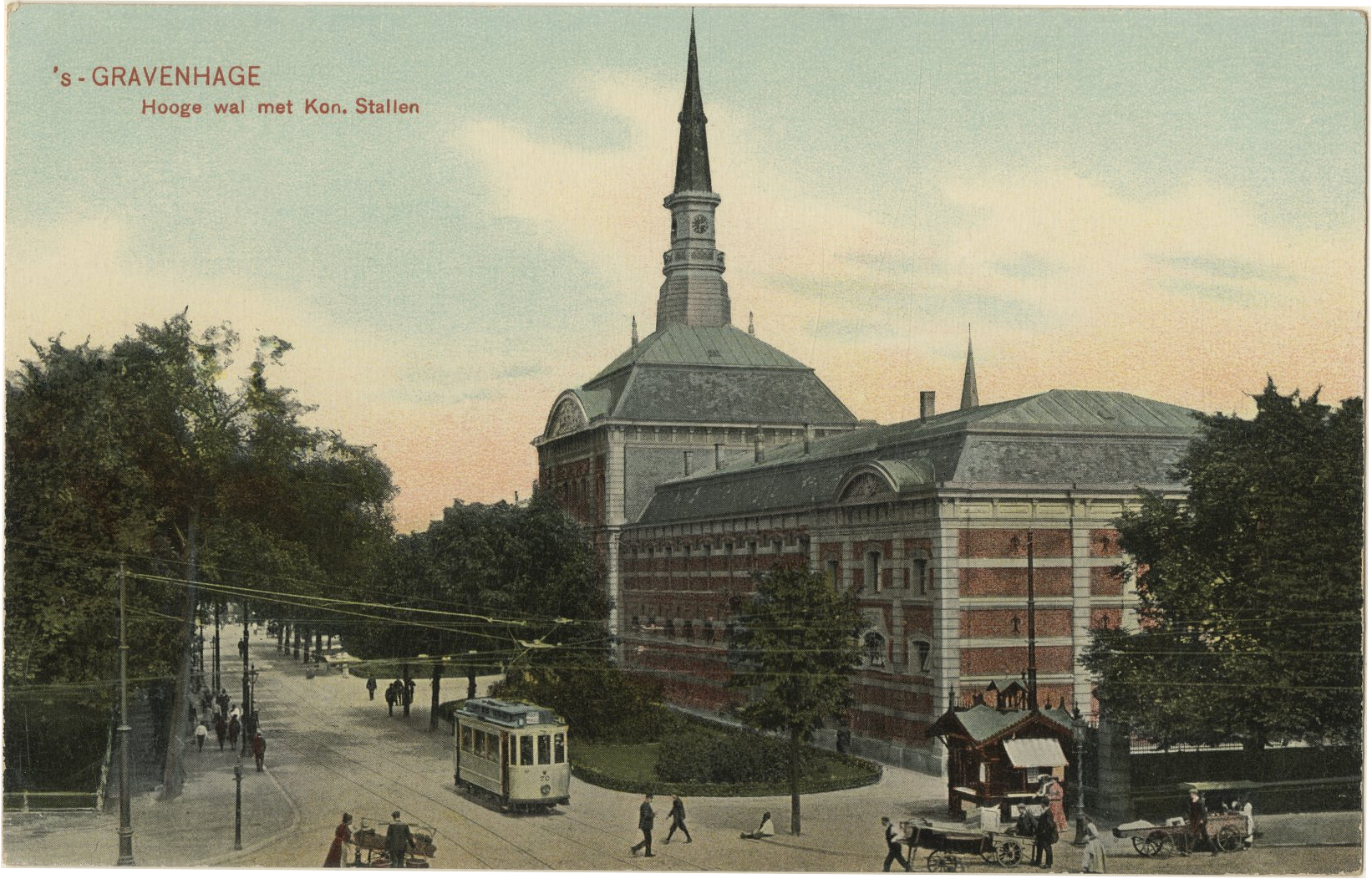
Hogewal (quayside) at the Royal Stables, The Hague, seen from the Piet Hein Square (1906).

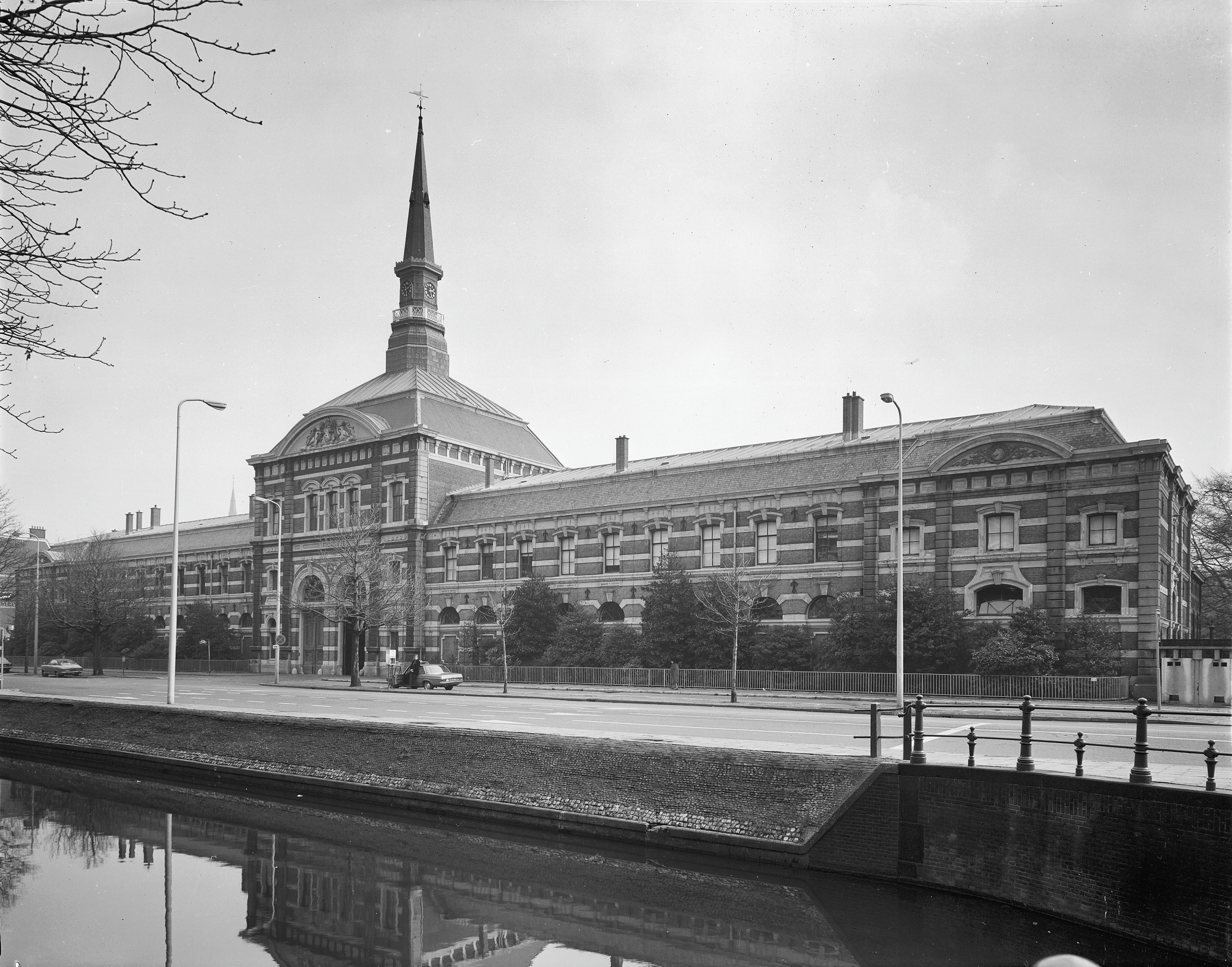
Royal Stables front facade.

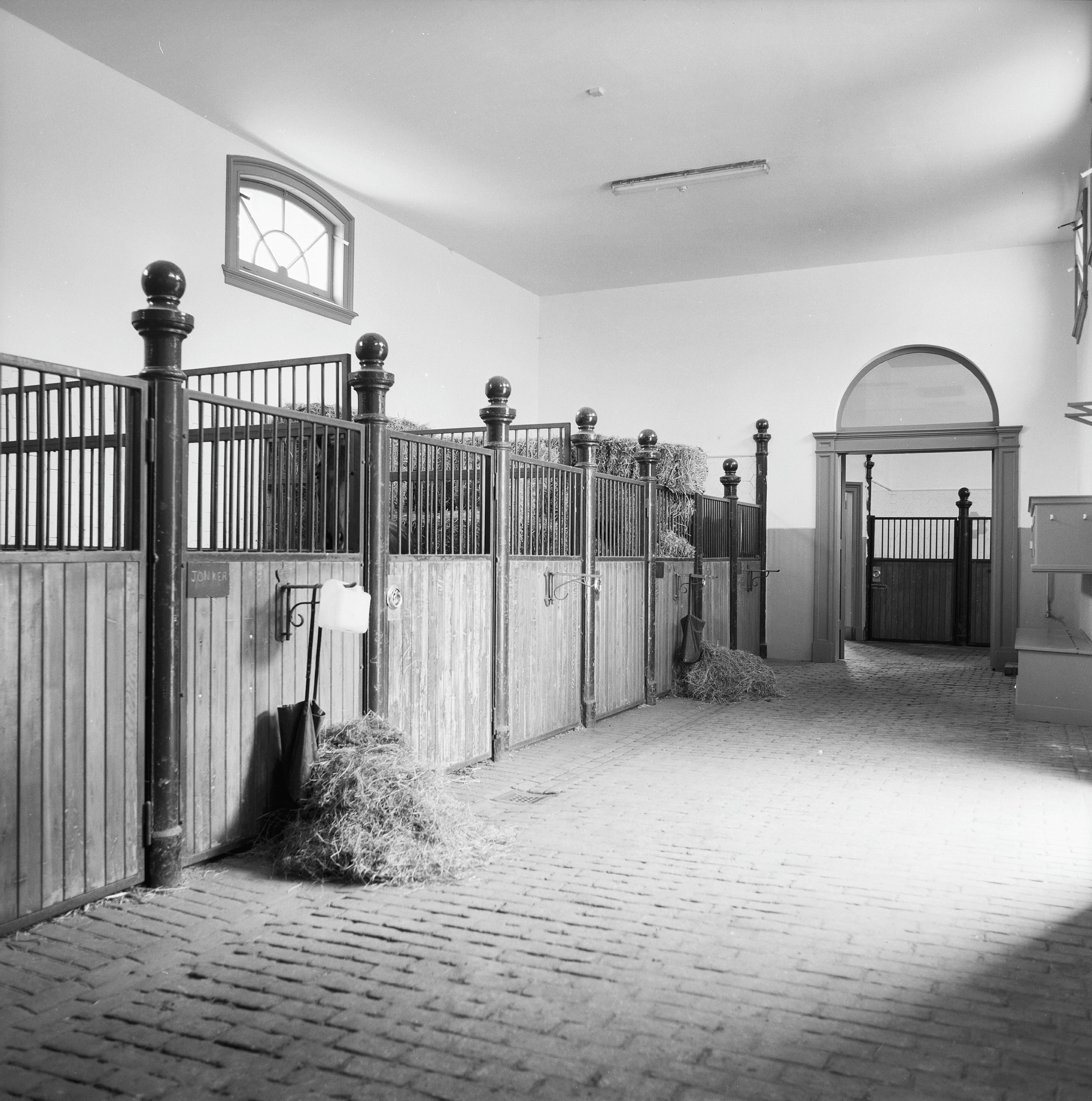
Interieur of the horse stables.

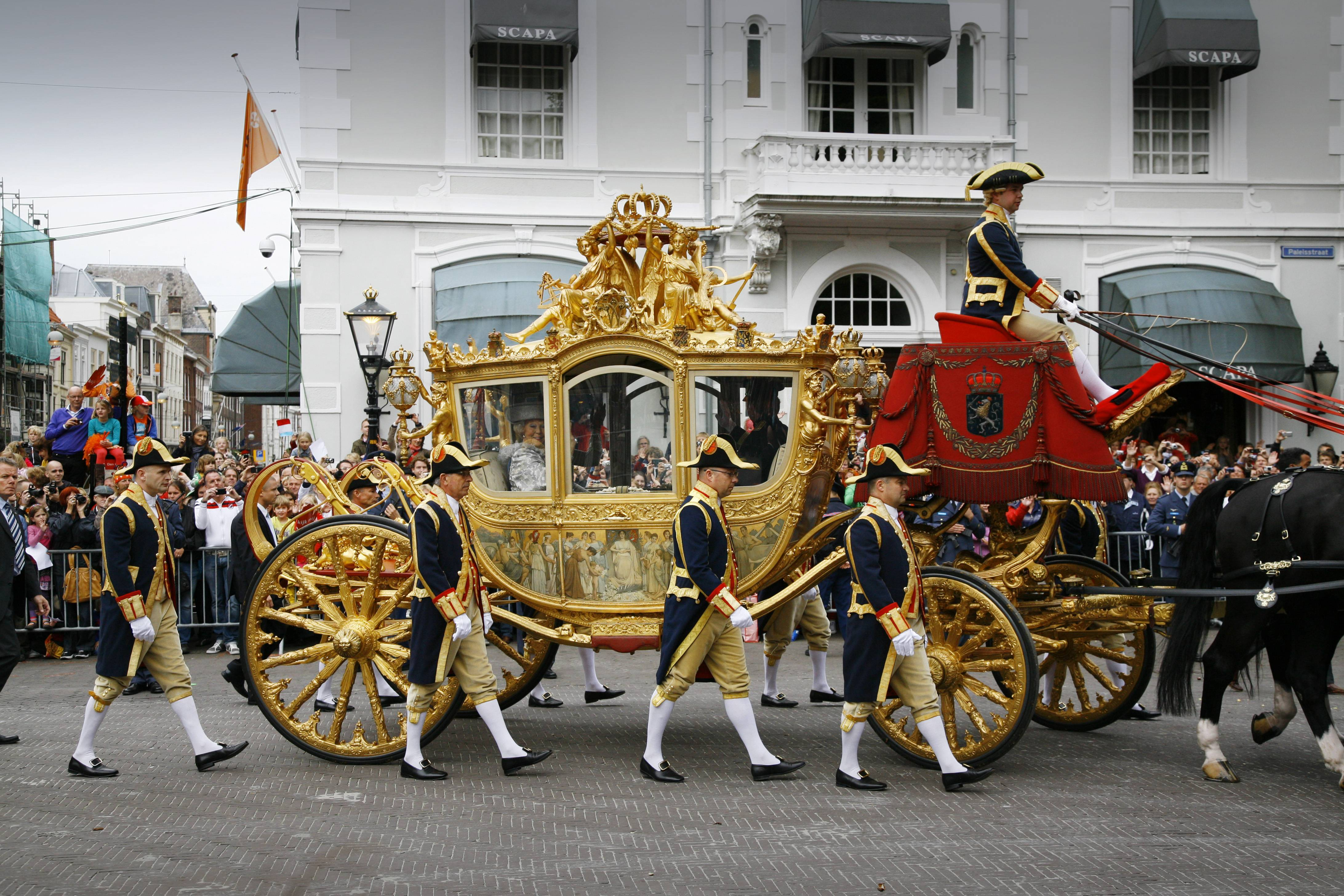
Golden Coach with stable horses on Prinsjesdag (2011).

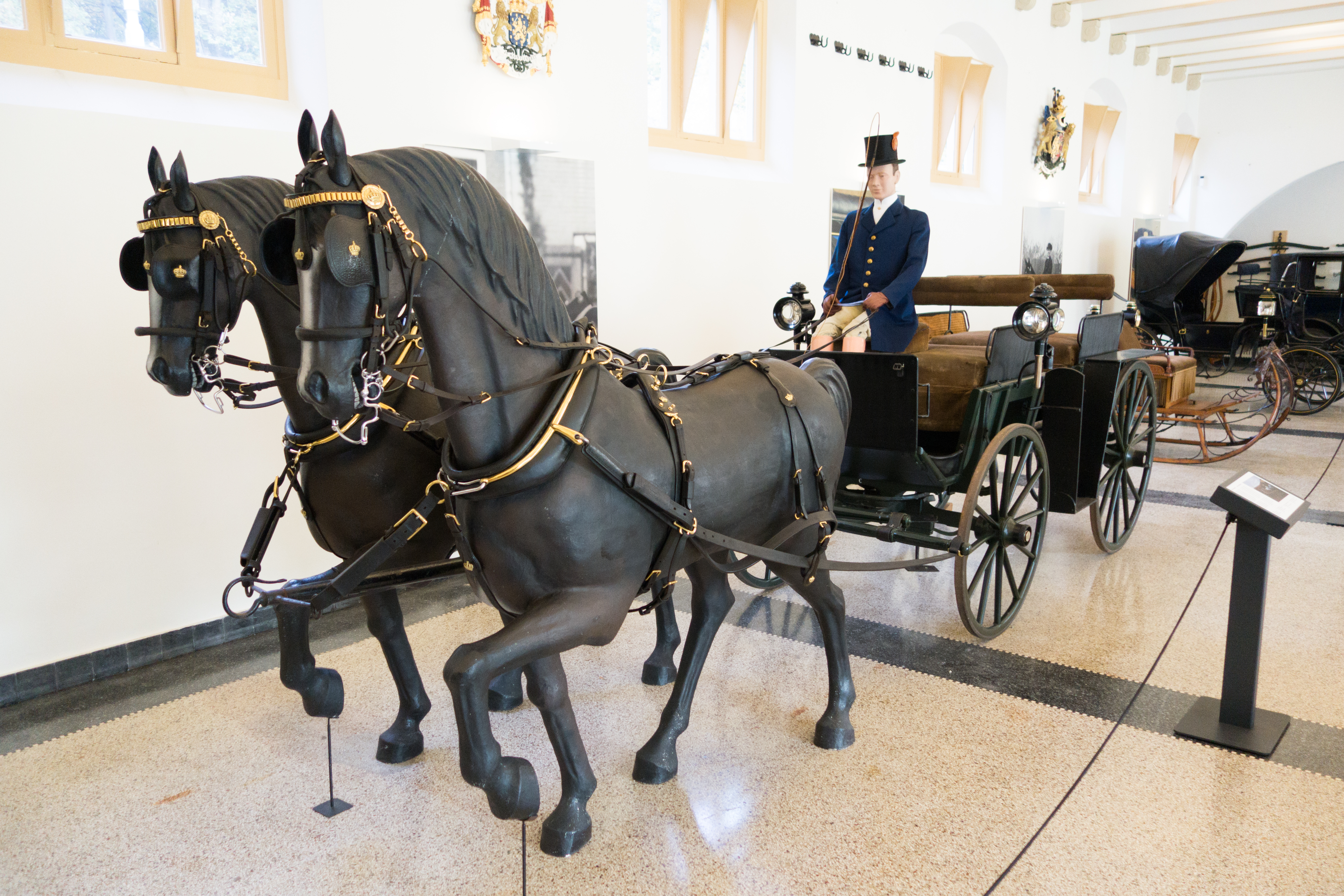
Carriage exhibition in the Royal Stables.

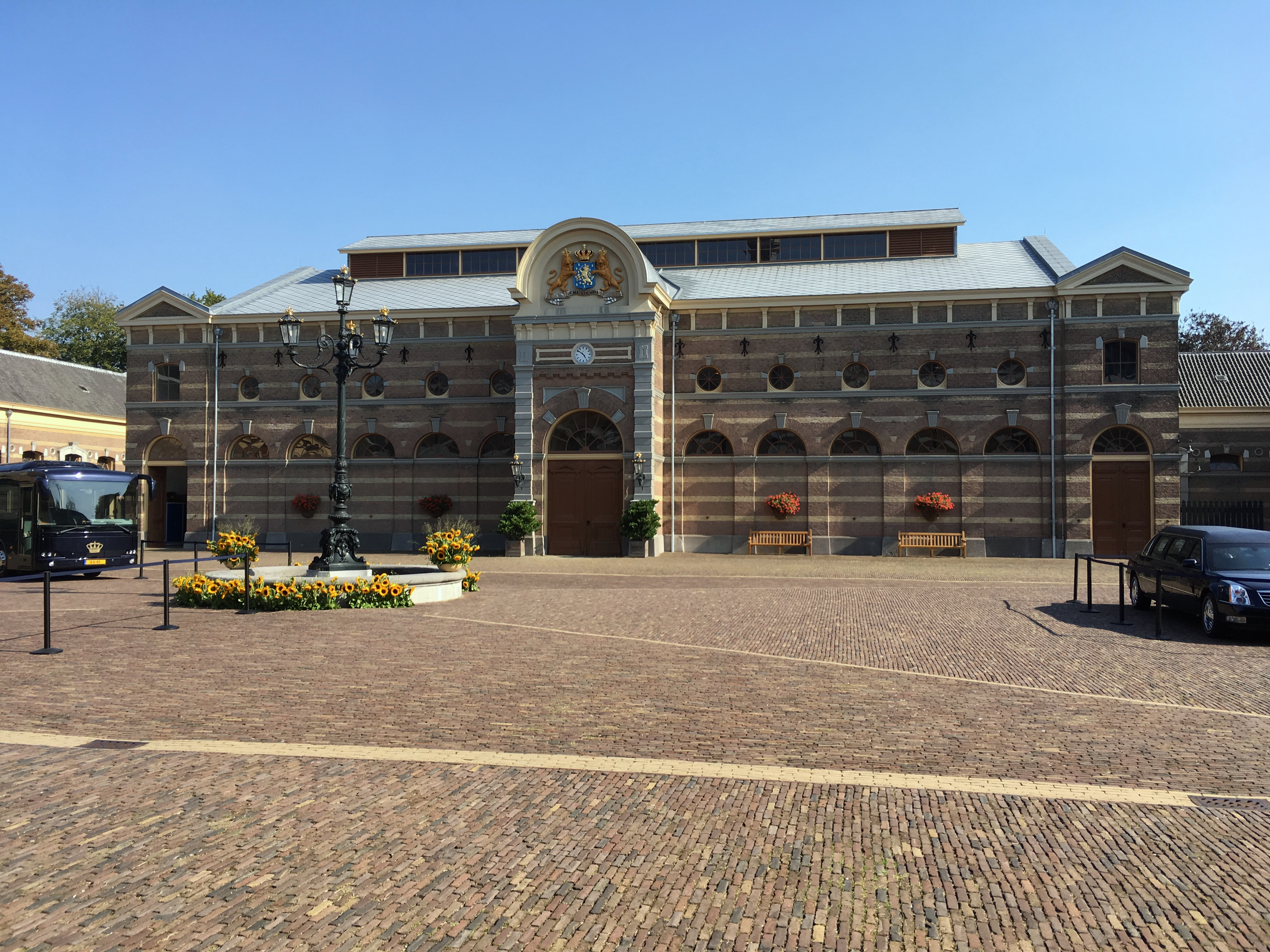
Stables courtyard.

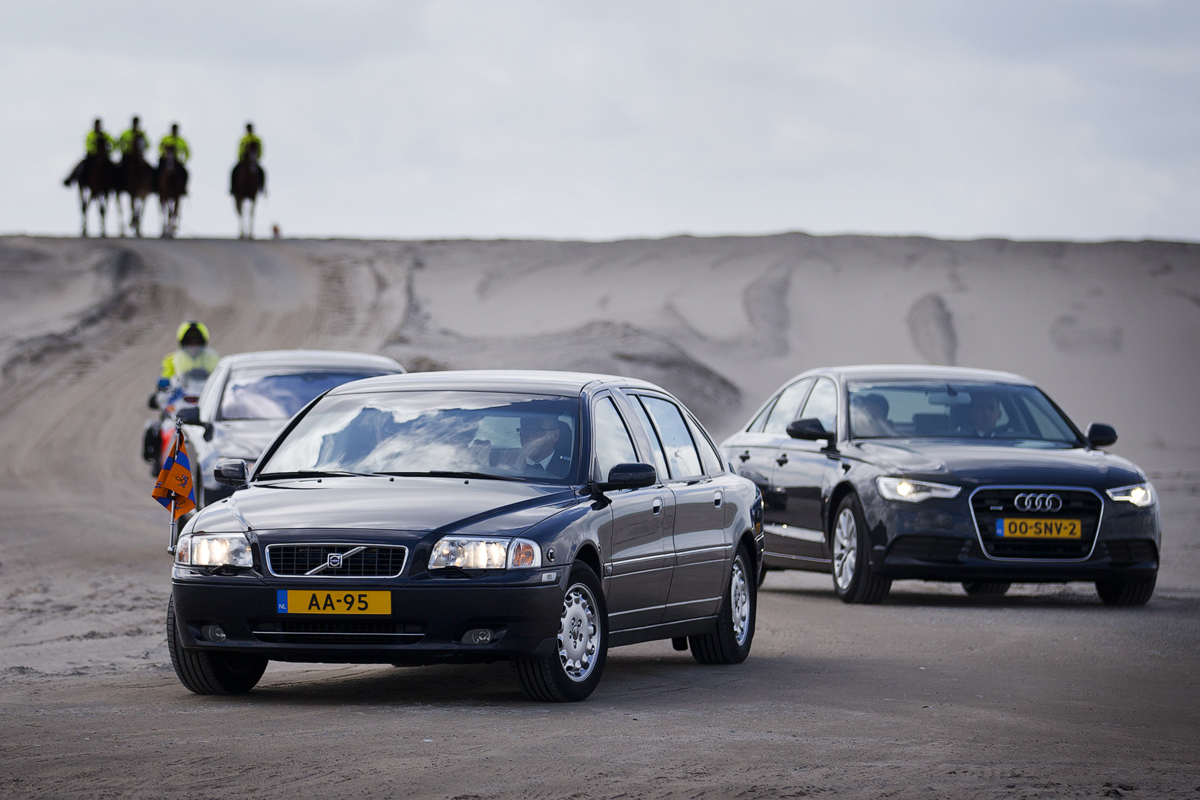
Royal cars of King Willem-Alexander with number plates starting with AA.

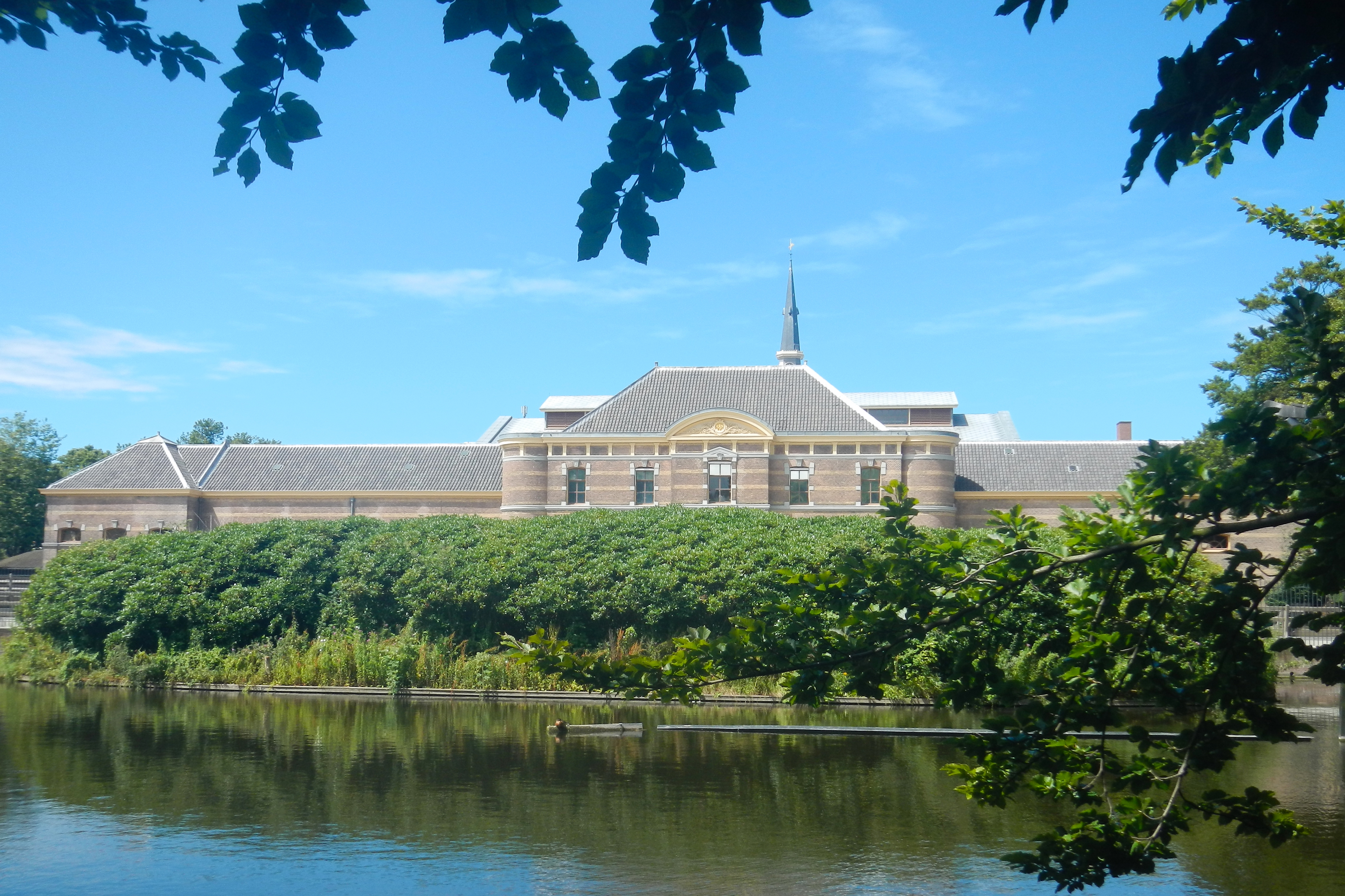
The back of the building as seen from the Palace Garden.

== See also ==
- Glass Coach
- Golden Coach
- Royal Mews, the Royal Stables of the British Crown
- Royal Stables (Sweden)
- Royal Stables (Denmark)
