= Ridderzaal =

Building on Binnenhof, The Hague, used for the state opening of Parliament

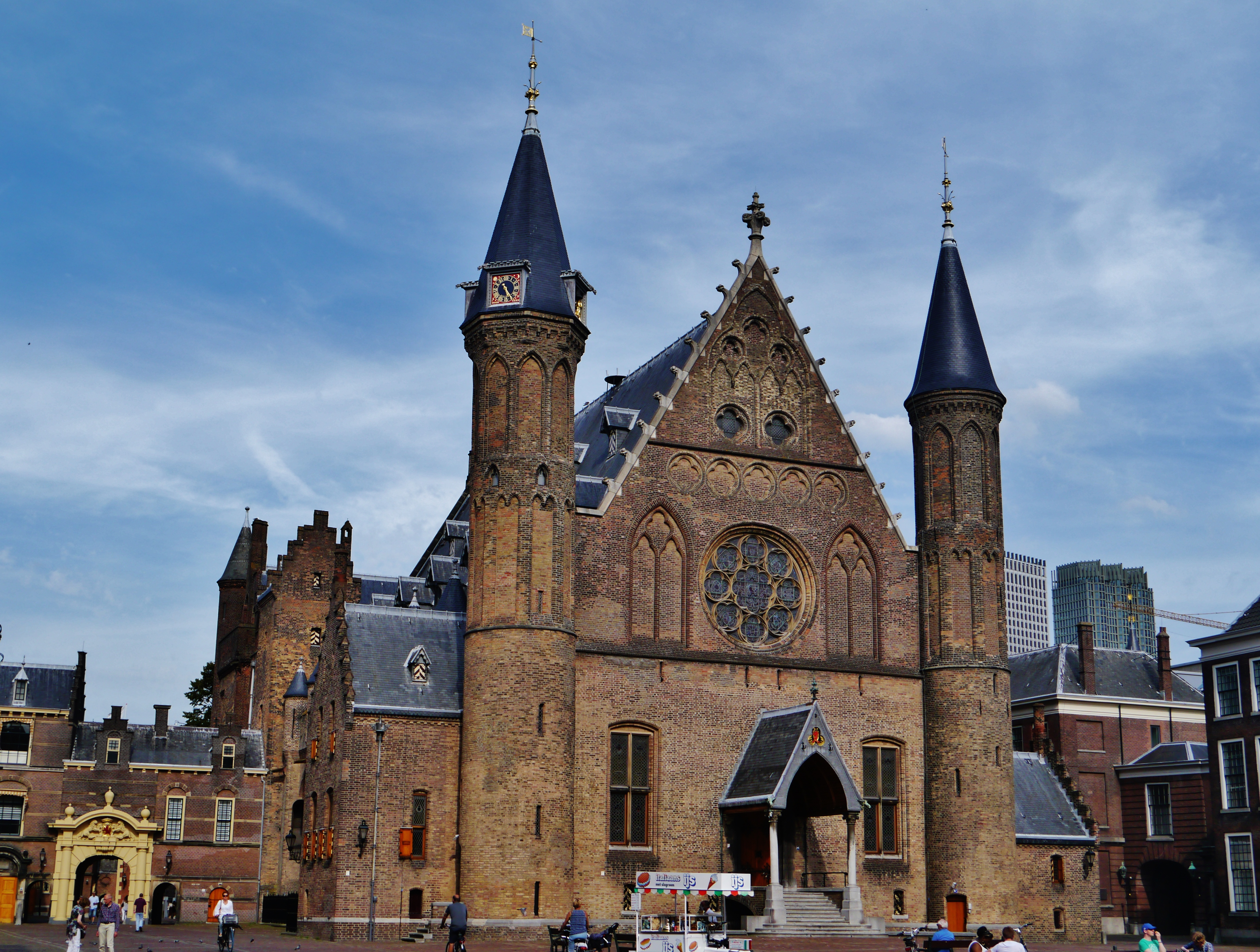
- The entrance of the Ridderzaal
- Interactive map of the Ridderzaal area

General information
- Architectural style: Gothic architecture
- Location: Binnenhof, The Hague, Netherlands
- Coordinates: 52.079444°N 4.312778°E
- Completed: 13th century
- Client: Floris V, Count of Holland

The Ridderzaal (Dutch pronunciation: [ˈrɪdərzaːl]; English: Hall of Knights) is the main building of the 13th-century inner square of the former castle of the counts of Holland called Binnenhof (English: Inner Court) at the address Binnenhof 11 in The Hague, Netherlands. It is used for the annual state opening of Parliament on Prinsjesdag, when the Dutch monarch drives to Parliament in the Golden Coach and delivers the speech from the throne. It is also used for official royal receptions, and inter-parliamentary conferences.

Due to the restoration of the Golden Coach and some controversy surrounding images on the left panel, portraying Hulde der Koloniën (Tribute from the colonies), the Glass Coach is used on Prinsjesdag since 2015.

== History ==
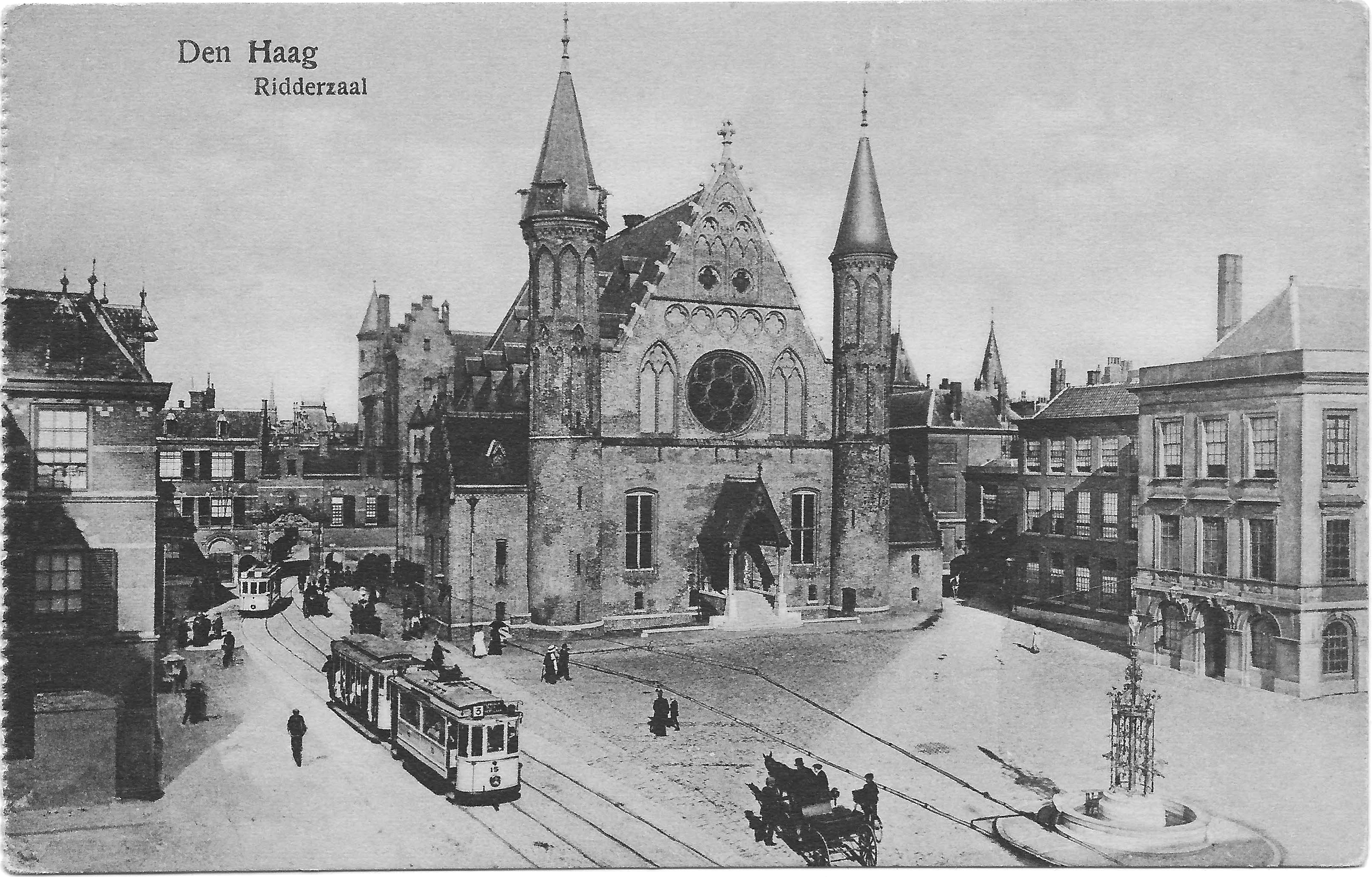
The Ridderzaal seen as it was before World War I

In the 13th century Floris IV, Count of Holland bought a piece of land next to a small lake to build a house on. The Ridderzaal, the manorial hall of Floris V, grandson of Floris IV, was built on this estate in the 13th century. Over the centuries, the government buildings developed around this lake and incorporated the Ridderzaal. From the early 17th century, the Ridderzaal became an important trading place for booksellers, as Westminster Hall was in London. In later centuries it served a variety of purposes - as a market hall, a promenade, a drill hall, a public record office, a hospital ward, even the offices of the state lottery. The hall was restored between 1898 and 1904 to serve its present purposes.

The Congress of Europe, considered by many as the first federal development of post-war European history, was held in The Hague in May 1948 with 750 European delegates as well as observers from Canada and the United States of America. The Hall of Knights was the main venue used for the congress. The delegates used the opportunity to discuss ideas about the development of European integration, which would eventually cultivate into the creation of the modern-day European Union.

The Ridderzaal was also the venue for the Dutch–Indonesian Round Table Conference in 1949. The government of the Netherlands discussed and negotiated with the newly created governments of the former colonial possessions in the Dutch Indies.

== Building ==
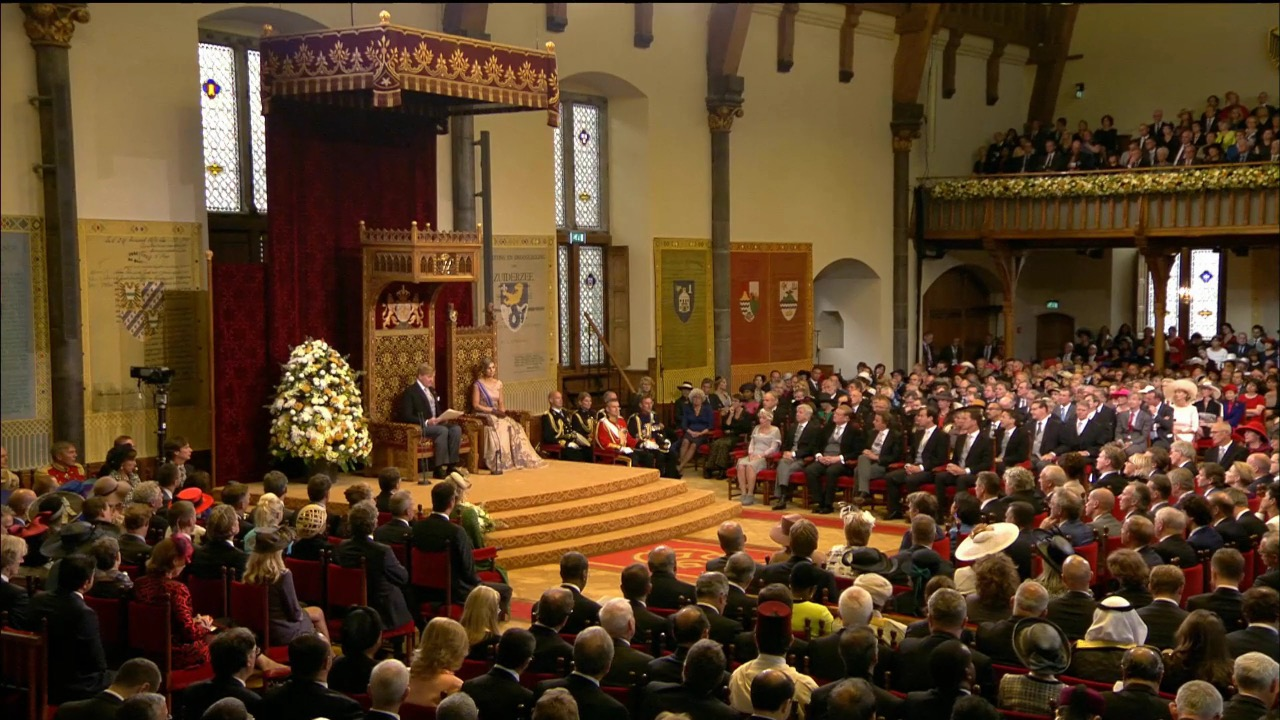
Throne of the monarchs of the Netherlands in the Ridderzaal

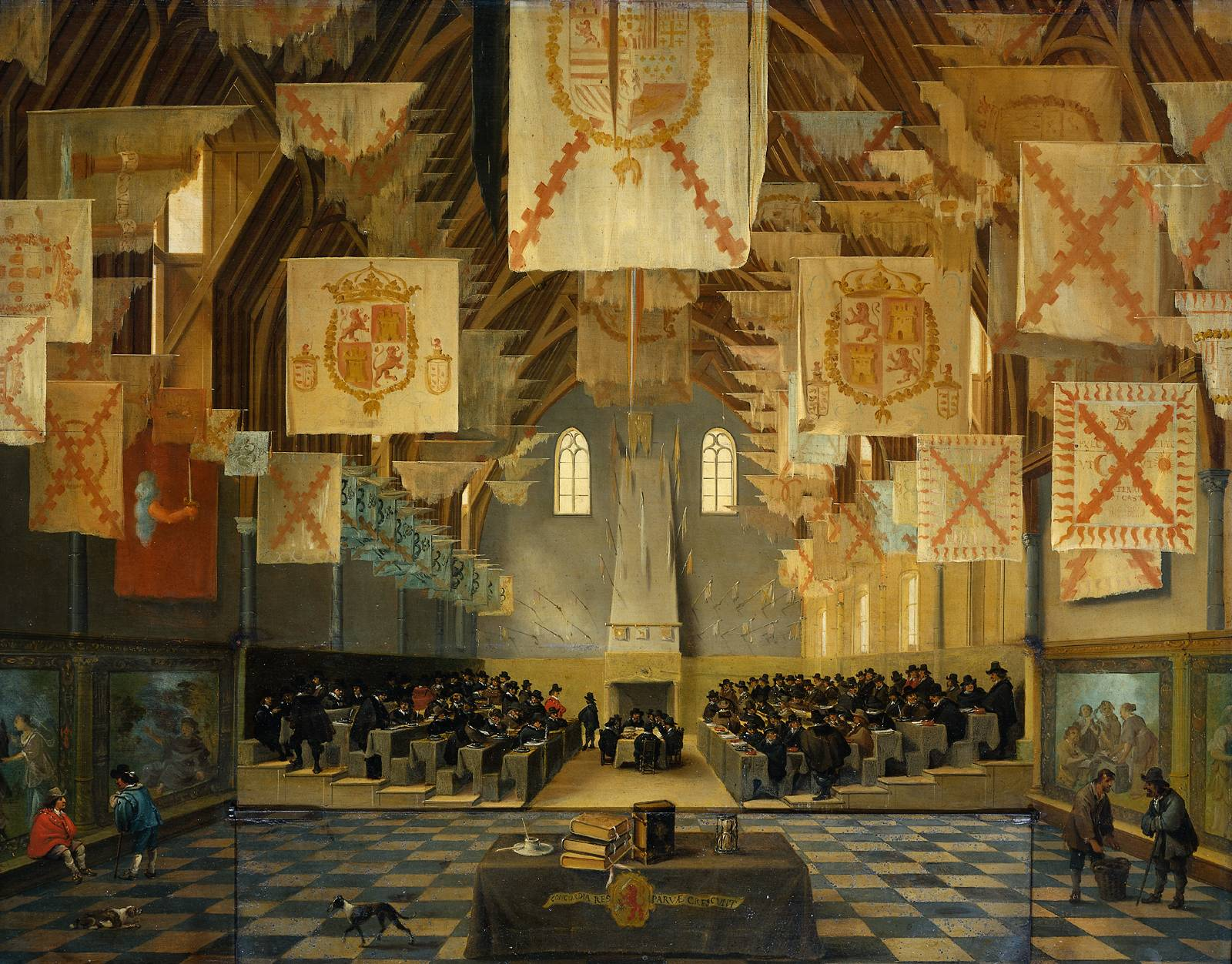
Meeting in the Ridderzaal in 1651, painted by Dirck van Delen

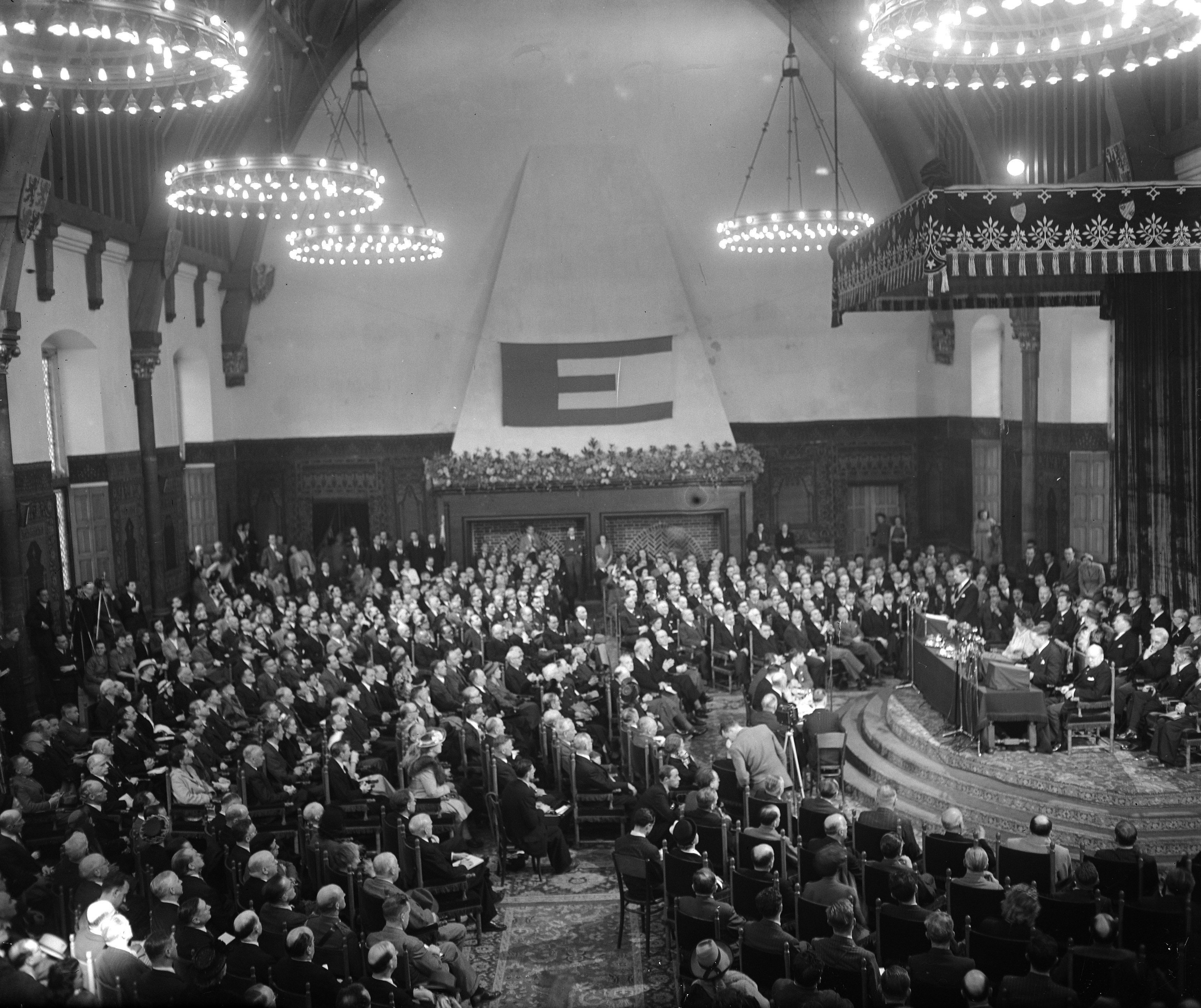
Meeting in the Hall of Knights during the Congress of Europe (9 May 1948)

This 40 by 20 metres (131 ft × 66 ft) large Gothic hall has magnificent stained glass windows depicting the coats of arms of various prominent Dutch towns and cities; particularly fine is the rose window with the arms of the principal noble families of the Netherlands. The heavy timber roof structure with its 18-metre-long beams (59 ft) has the appearance of an upturned ship. Wooden heads symbolizing eavesdroppers from the higher powers are supposed to deter members of the assembly from lying.

The throne in the Ridderzaal was designed by Pierre Cuypers.
