= Golden Coach (Netherlands) =

Coach used by the Dutch royal family

- Gouden Koets (Dutch)
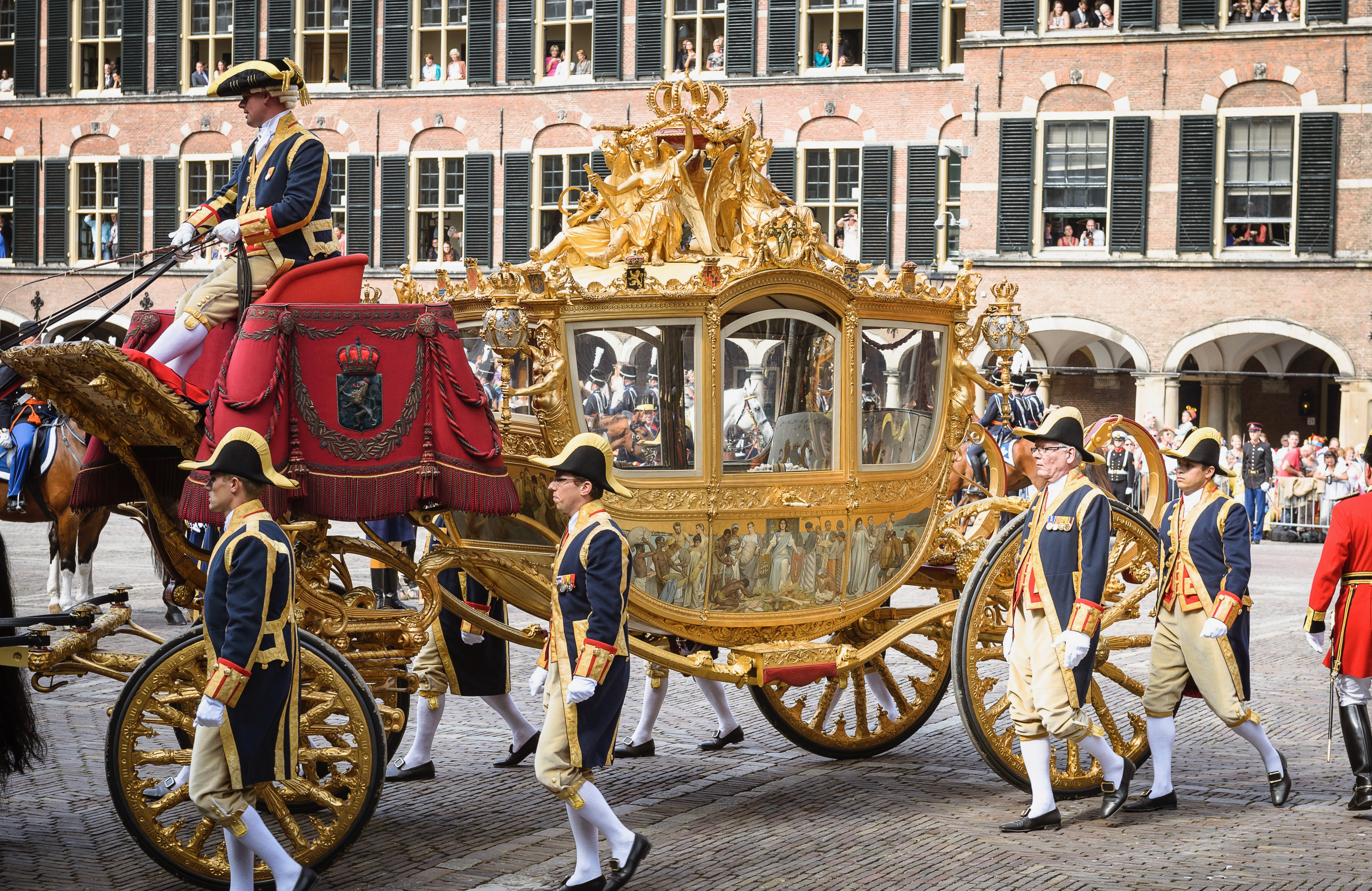
- Artist: Spyker (coachbuilder), Nicolaas van der Waay (paintings)
- Completion date: 1898
- Type: Berlin coach in the Dutch renaissance style
- Condition: Restored 2016-2021, withdrawn from ceremonial use in 2022
- Location: Royal Stables
- Owner: Monarchy of the Netherlands
- Website: Gouden Koets

The Golden Coach (Dutch: Gouden Koets) is a coach owned by the Dutch royal family. The Golden Coach was used every year to carry the Dutch monarch from the Noordeinde Palace to the Ridderzaal in order to deliver the Speech from the Throne or the wedding of the Prince of Orange or the Princess of Orange. The Golden Coach is stored at the Royal Stables on the Noordeinde Palace grounds in The Hague.

== Description ==
The coach is made of teak wood, much of which is covered in gold leaf. It is decorated with paintings by Nicolaas van der Waay and various symbolic ornaments. The coach was built in Dutch Renaissance style. It is pulled by eight horses when the reigning monarch is being carried, and six horses when other members of the royal family are travelling in the coach. Queen Wilhelmina wanted to be able to stand upright in the coach, which explains the curved form of the coach's roof. This increased height of the coach has made it more difficult to drive.

In September 2022, following analysis of a gold sample taken during the coach's restoration, experts agreed that the gold "was most likely to have been mined in the former Dutch colony [Suriname] during the 19th century".

Details

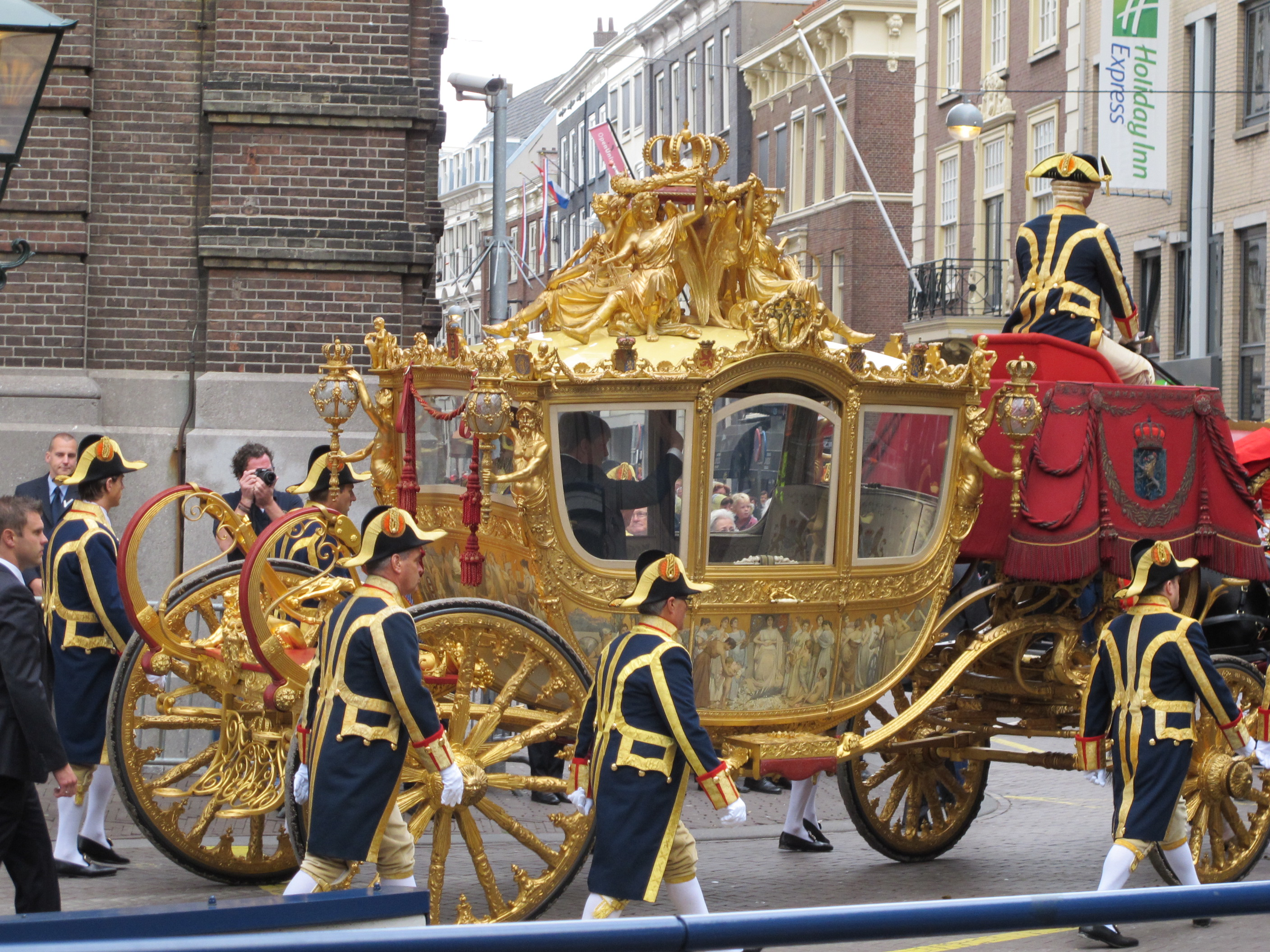
Gilded framework and undercarriage

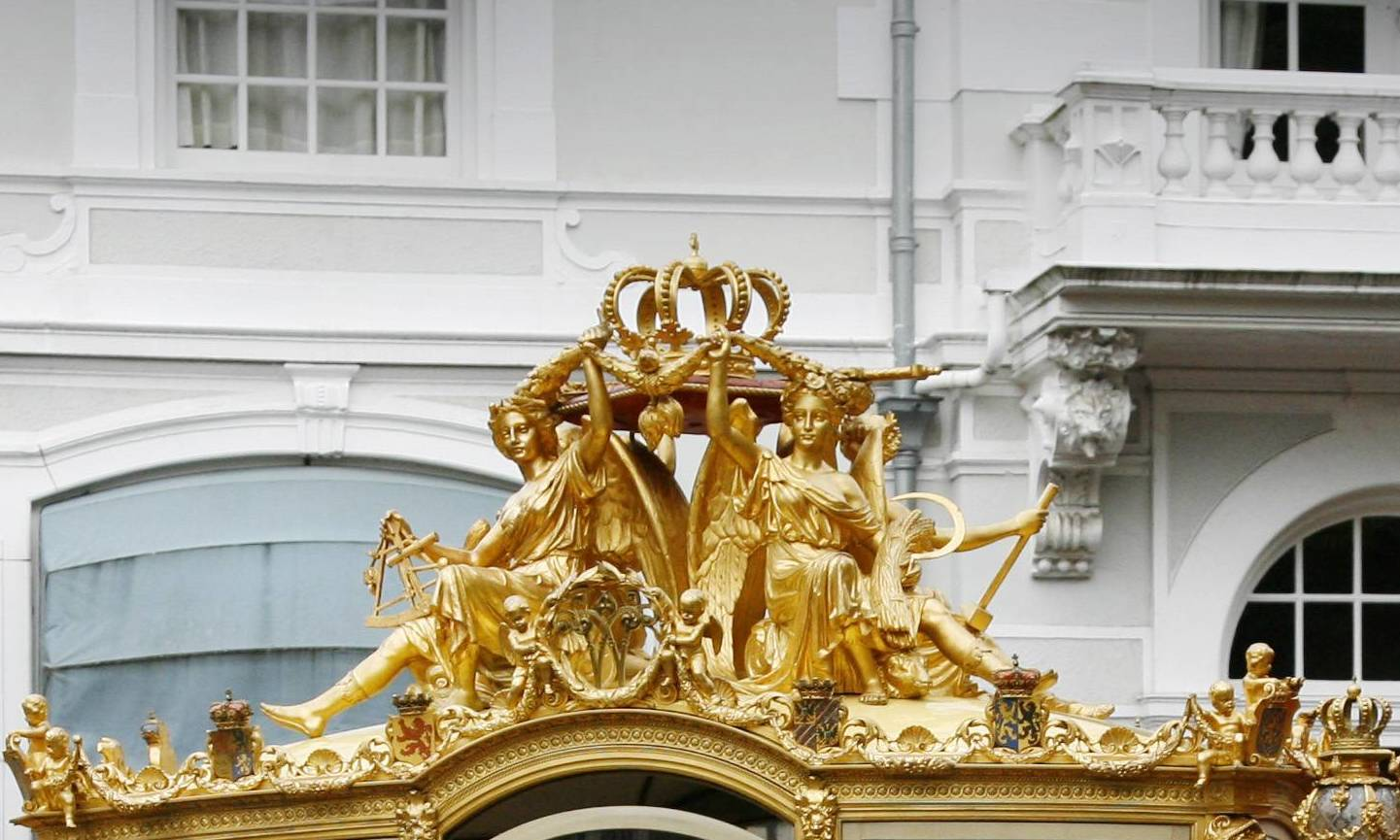
Gilded sculptures on top

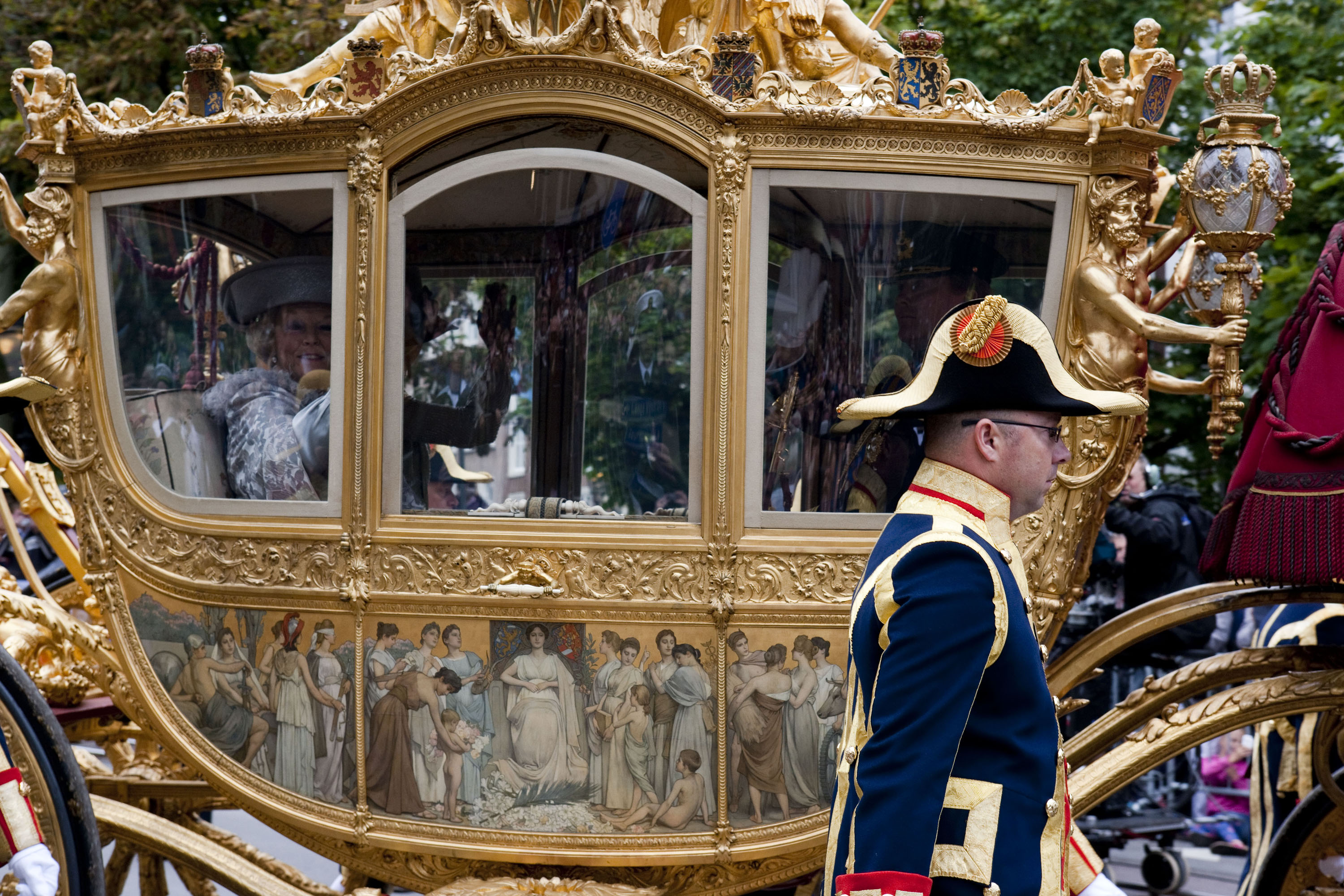
Right-side panels, "Tribute from the Netherlands"

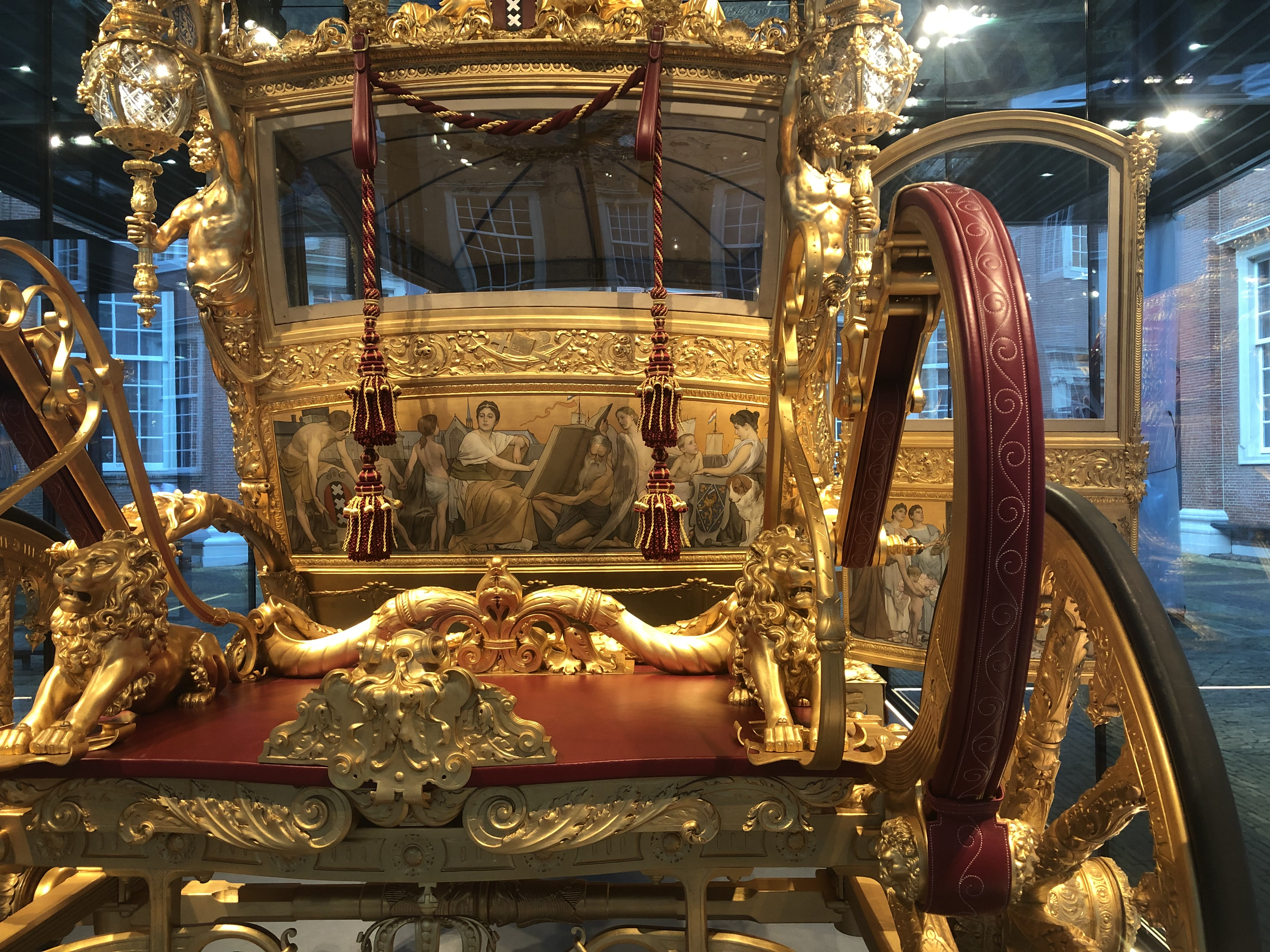
Artwork on the rear

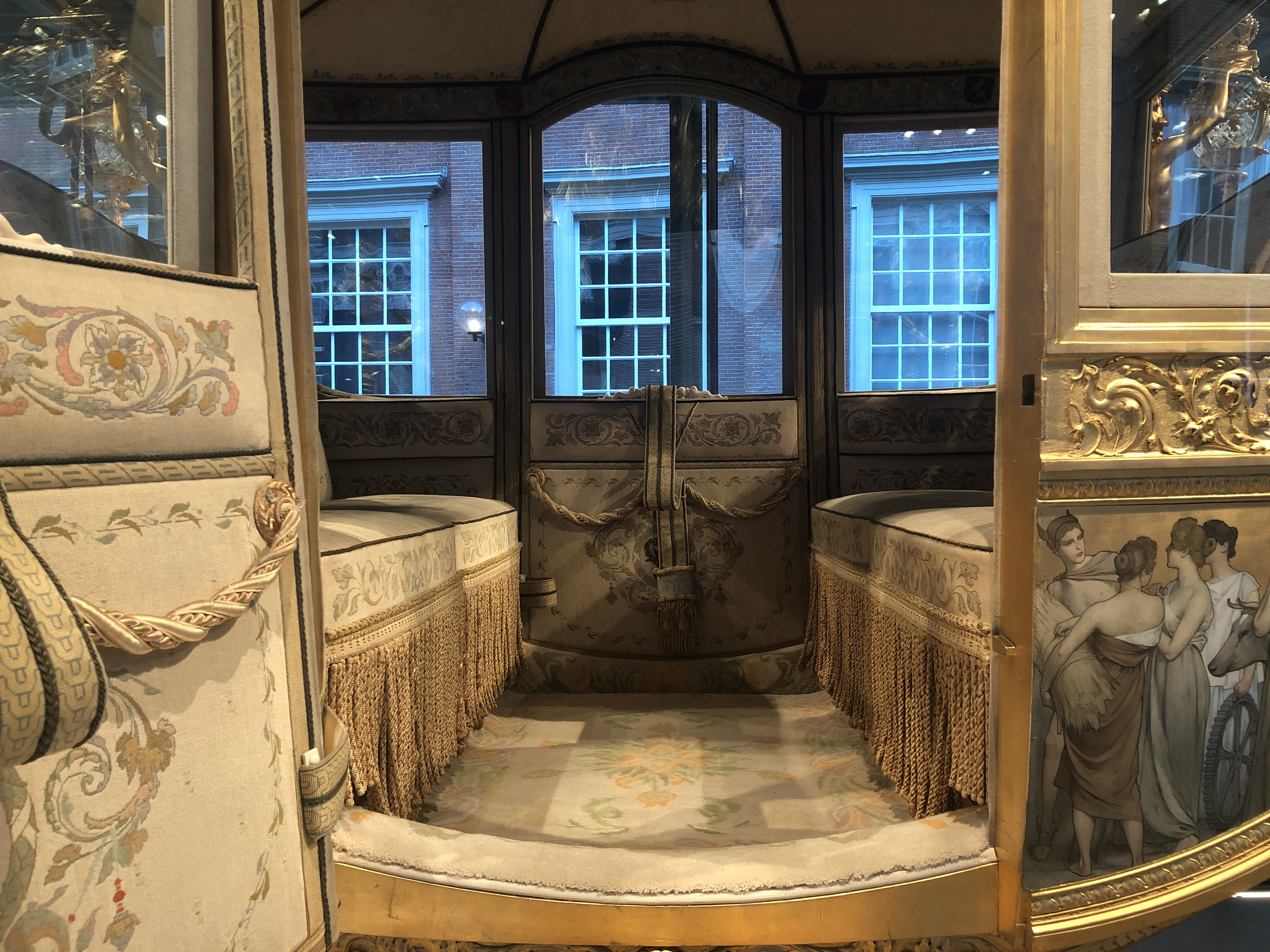
Interior

== History ==
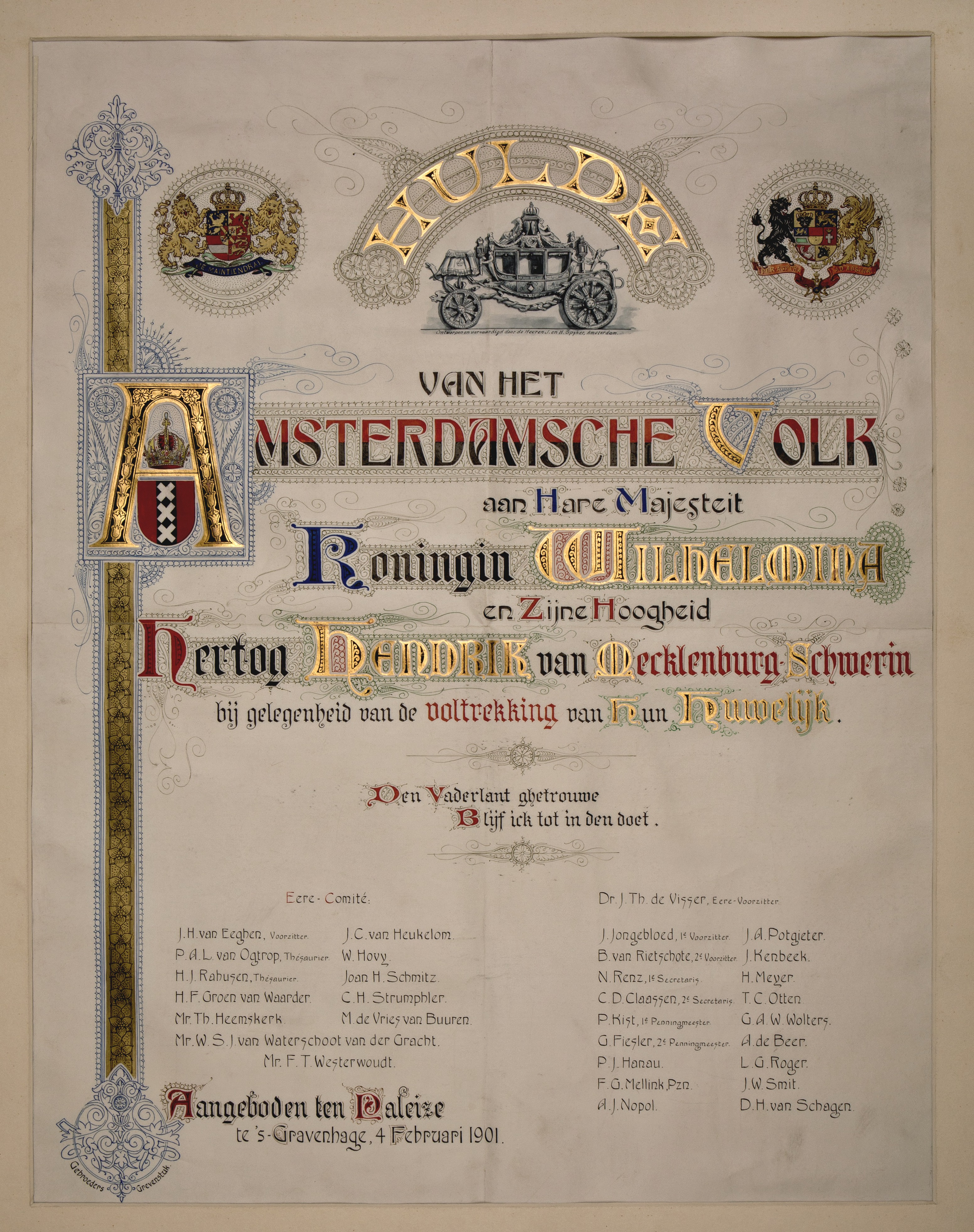
Certificate of the presentation of the Golden Coach, February 4, 1901

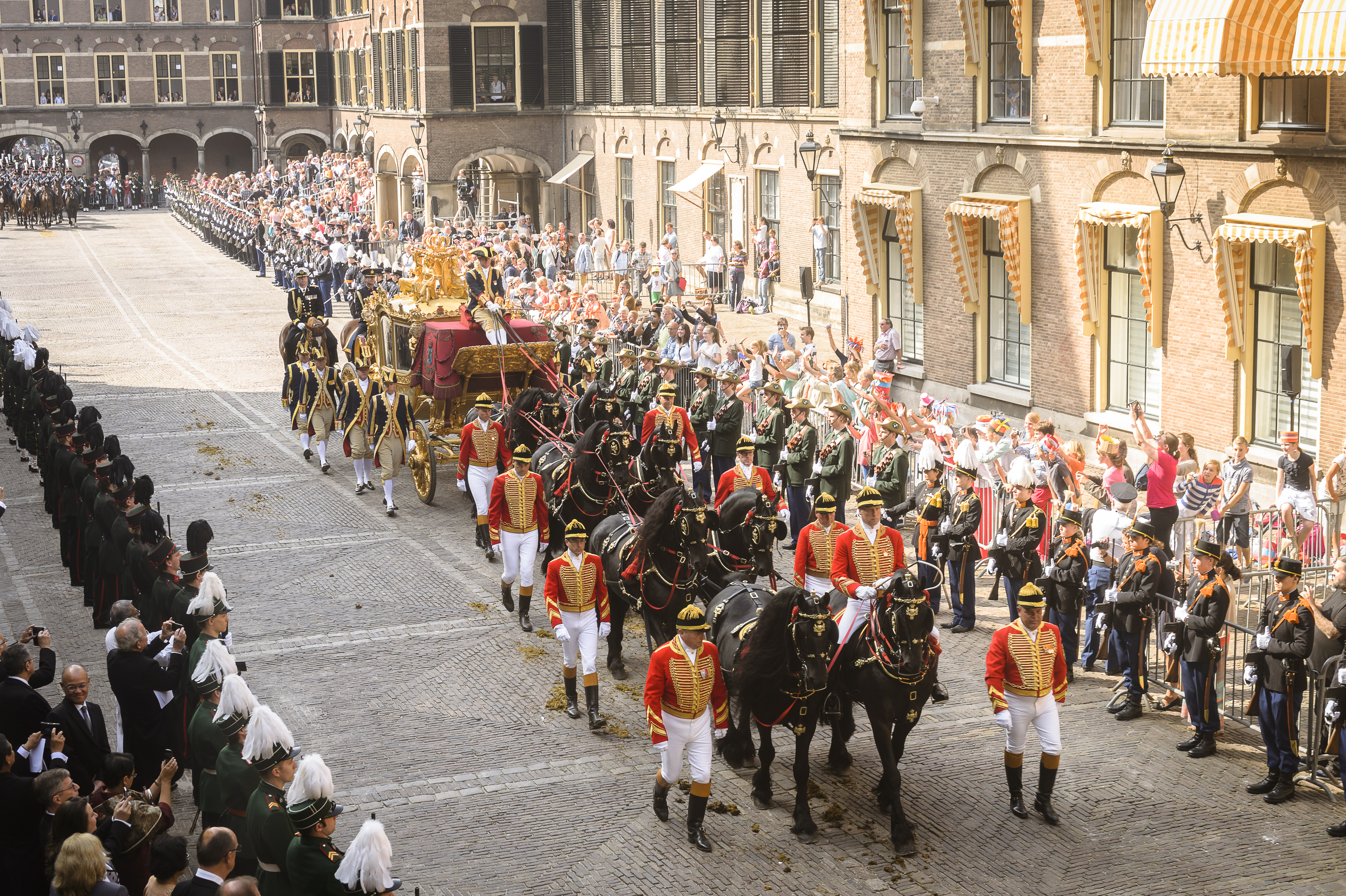
The Golden Coach in use during Prinsjesdag, 2014

Queen Wilhelmina received the Golden Coach at her 1898 investiture as a tribute from the citizens of Amsterdam. The coach was designed and built by the Spijker brothers. Because Queen Wilhelmina wished not to receive gifts on the day of her inauguration on September 6, 1898, she actually took receipt of the Golden Coach the following day.

The vehicle was first used on the occasion of the marriage of Queen Wilhelmina and Prince Hendrik on February 7, 1901. Since 1903 it has mainly been used once a year, in The Hague, on the third Tuesday in September, Prinsjesdag, on the occasion of the Monarch's Address. In 1974 however the coach was not used for security reasons, due to the French Embassy siege.

Other occasions when the carriage has been used are:

- the wedding of Princess Juliana and Prince Bernhard (The Hague, 1937)
- the baptism of Princess Beatrix (1938)
- the inauguration of Queen Juliana (Amsterdam, 1948)
- the wedding of Princess Beatrix of the Netherlands and Claus van Amsberg (Amsterdam, 1966)
- the wedding of Willem-Alexander, Prince of Orange, and Máxima Zorreguieta Cerruti (Amsterdam, 2002)

At the wedding of Willem-Alexander and Máxima someone threw some white paint on the coach. He was immediately arrested, while the wet paint was quickly wiped away by a footman. On Prinsjesdag in 2010 a man threw a tea light holder against the Golden Coach, causing minor scratches to the paintwork. The man was convicted of insulting the Queen, damaging the Golden Coach, and assaulting the coach's footmen—he was found to be mentally incapable and was sentenced to a year in a psychiatric clinic.

In September 2015, it was announced that the coach would undergo a major refit for the next three to four years and that the Glass Coach would be substituted during the refit.

== Controversy over artwork ==
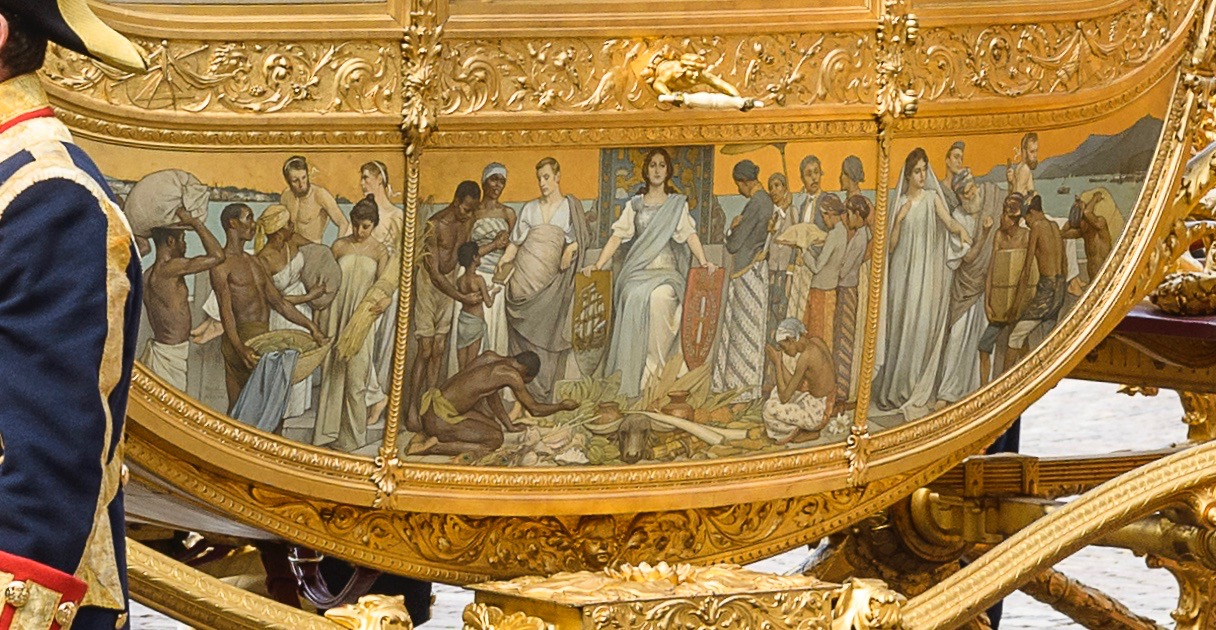
Left panel artwork, "Tribute from the colonies"

In 2011, MPs Harry van Bommel and Mariko Peters suggested removing the left panel, portraying Hulde der Koloniën (Tribute from the colonies). According to activists, the panel showed half-naked slaves in gestures of submission to the royal house. Historians, on the other hand, stated that the scene does not depict slaves or the royal family, nor is it a glorification of the colonies. The panel shows the relations with the colonies at that point and, according to historian Susan Legêne of the Vrije Universiteit Amsterdam, refers to the discussion about the Dutch Ethical Policy that focused on a moral vocation that the Netherlands should feel towards the people in the colonies.

== Modern use ==
After the Golden Coach was renovated, it was displayed in a glass display case on the courtyard of the Amsterdam Museum from June until November 2021. In six surrounding halls were expositions of the history of the Golden Coach. There was also a study room for debate.

On 13 January 2022, King Willem-Alexander announced that he would not ride in the coach until all citizens feel they are equal and given fair opportunities.

The carriage is stored at the Royal Stables.

== See also ==
- Glass Coach (Dutch royal carriage)
- List of state coaches
