= Prinsjesdag =

Royal holiday in the Netherlands

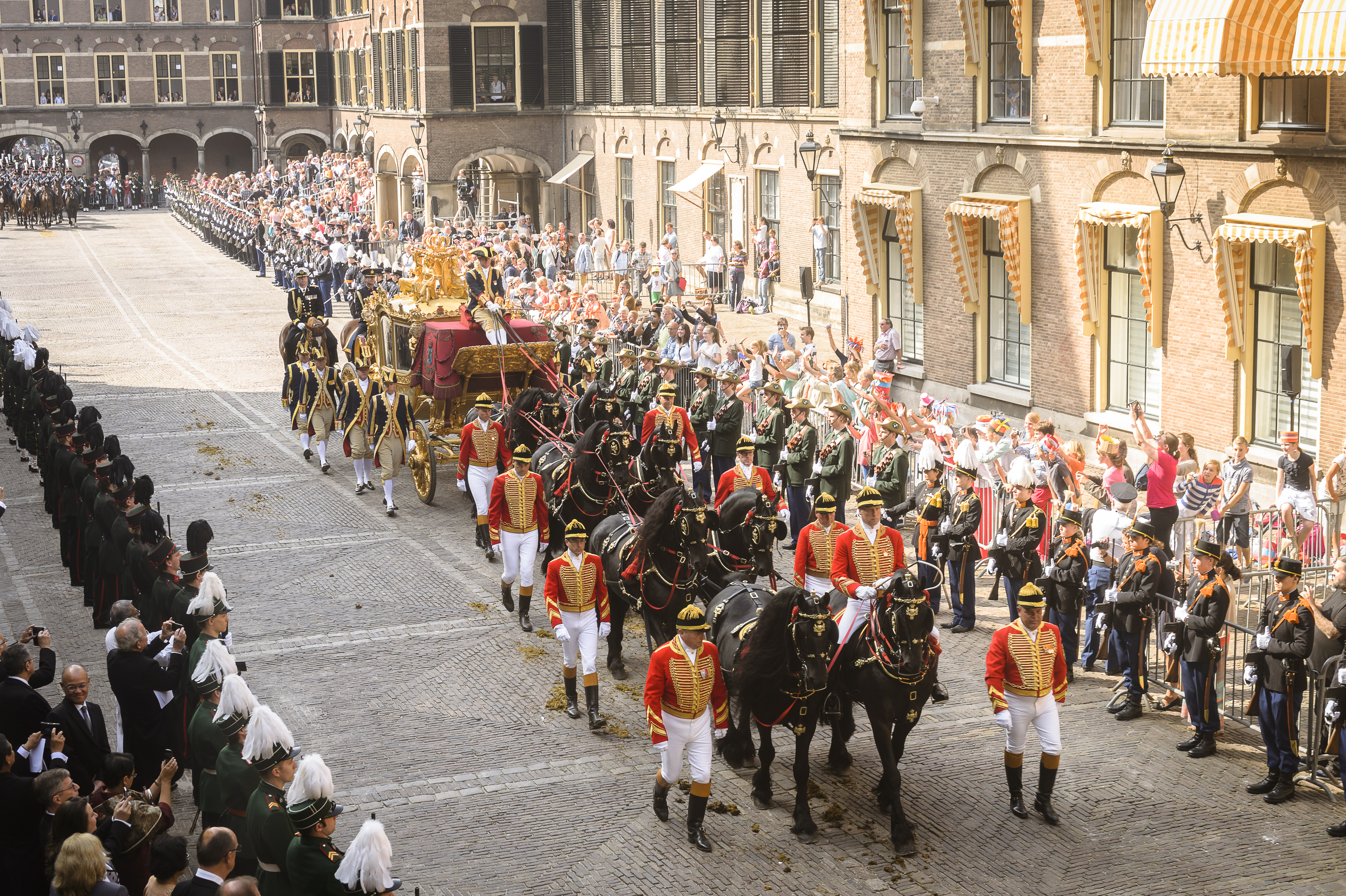
The Golden Coach on Prinsjesdag 2014.

Video impression of the Prince’s Day Procession 2014.

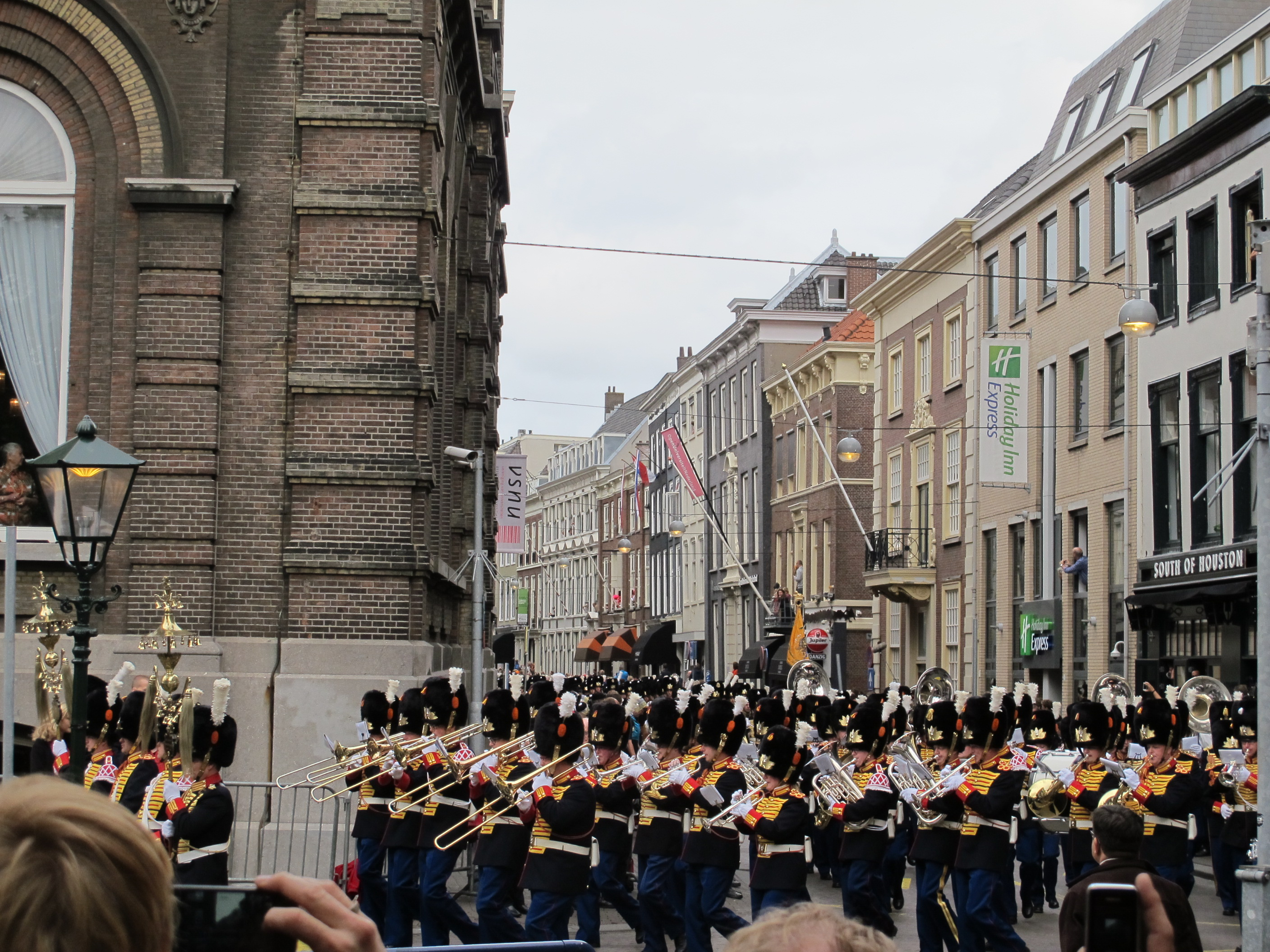
The Royal Military Band “Johan Willem Friso” during Prinsjesdag 2013.

Prinsjesdag (Prince's Day) is the day on which the reigning monarch of the Netherlands addresses a joint session of the States-General of the Netherlands (consisting of the Senate and the House of Representatives) to give the Speech from the Throne (Dutch: Troonrede), similar to the annual State of the Union in the United States or the British State Opening of Parliament. This speech sets out the main features of government policy for the coming parliamentary session.

The occasion is prescribed by the constitution, article 65 of which states: "A statement of the policy to be pursued by the Government shall be given by or on behalf of the King or the Queen before a joint session of the two Houses of the States-General that shall be held every year on the third Tuesday in September or on such earlier date as may be prescribed by Act of Parliament." Article 105, paragraph 2 of the Constitution adds that this coincides with the submission of the budget.

After the speech from the throne, the budget is later presented to the House of Representatives by the Minister of Finance.

== Speech from the Throne ==
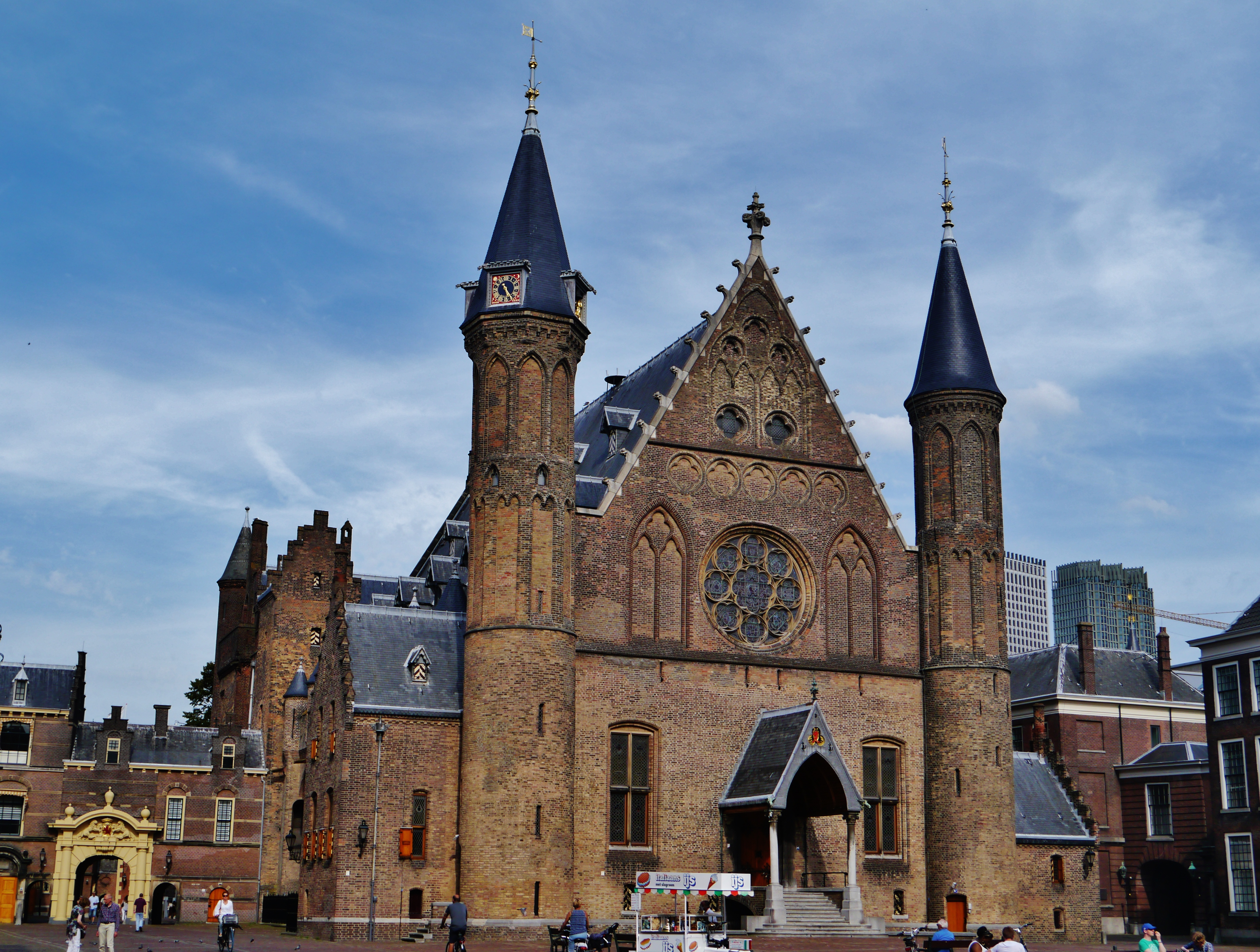
Ridderzaal in The Hague, Netherlands, 2015.

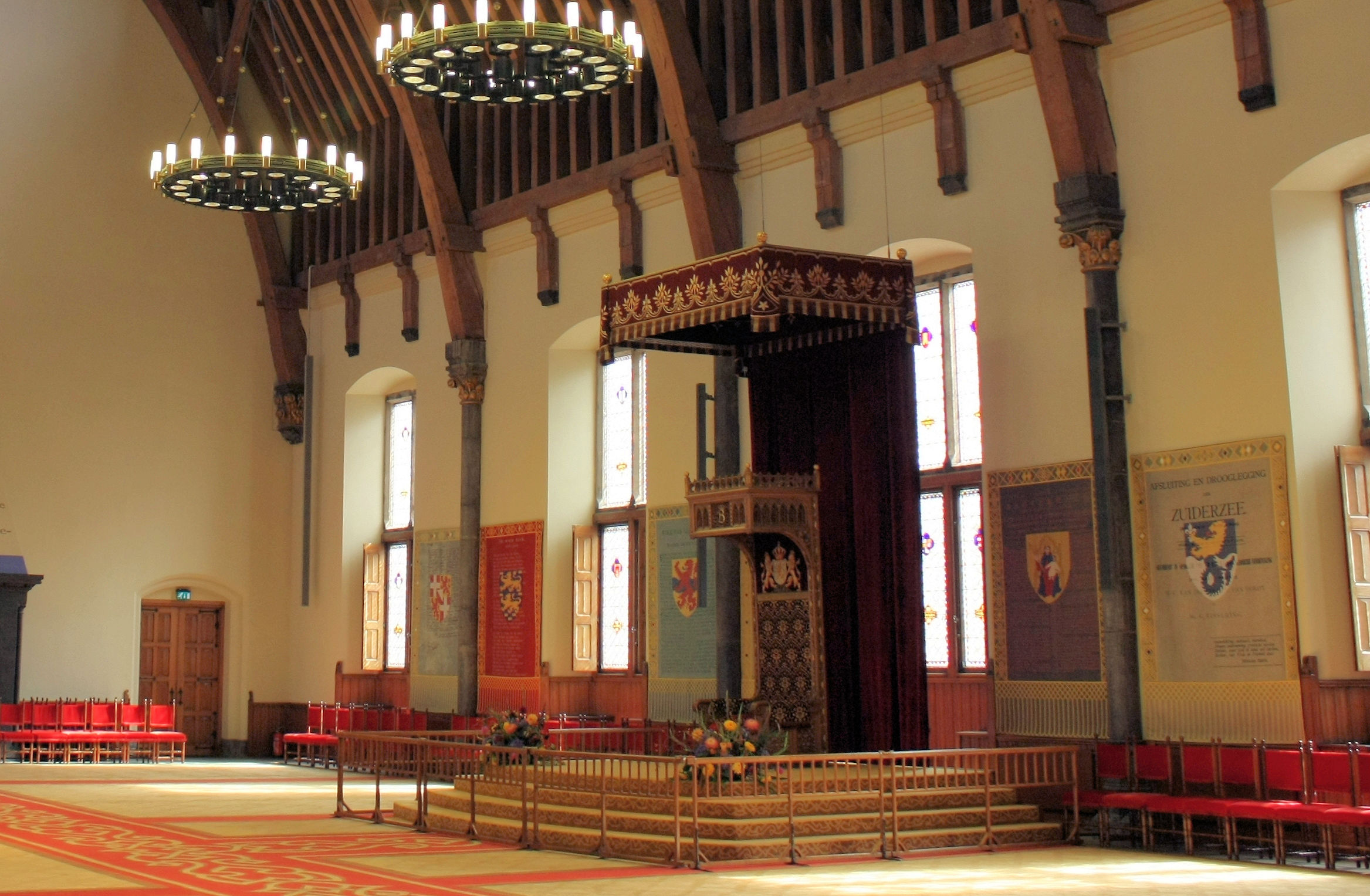
Throne of the monarchs of the Netherlands in the Ridderzaal in The Hague, 2010.

The Speech from the throne, 2014.

The first part of Prinsjesdag is the Speech from the Throne at the assembly of the States-General in the Ridderzaal.

At around 12:30 on Prinsjesdag, the members of the Senate and House of Representatives enter the Ridderzaal.

They sit opposite and to the left and right of the throne. The ministers and state secretaries sit to the left of the throne. Behind them sit members of the Council of State, the government’s highest advisory body. They all sit in the enceinte, an area enclosed by unobtrusive wooden barriers symbolising that the head of state is in conference with Parliament.

Outside the enceinte are seats for the other High Councils of State, senior civil servants, high-ranking officers of the armed forces, senior members of the judiciary, the King’s or the Queen's Commissioner of the province of South Holland, the mayor of The Hague and specially invited guests.

At the stroke of one, the King or the Queen, normally accompanied by other members of the Royal House, leaves Noordeinde Palace in the Golden Coach (Glass Coach sometimes) for the Binnenhof, escorted by court dignitaries and a military escort of honour. Outside the palace stands an escort of honour and a military band.

As the King or the Queen arrives at the Binnenhof, a military band by the steps plays the Wilhelmus (national anthem). The King and other members of the Royal House salute the colour of the Royal Netherlands Marine Corps (the oldest regiment in the Dutch armed forces) and walk the Ridderzaal’s steps, above which hangs a canopy.

The president of the Senate presides over the joint session. Shortly before 13:00, he opens the meeting and then appoints a number of ushers from among the members of the two Houses to escort the King and his entourage. On this occasion, male MPs wear their most formal dress, while female MPs try to outdo each other with extravagant hats.

The ushers receive the King or the Queen and the members of the Royal House at the entrance to the Ridderzaal. The president of the joint session then announces the arrival of the head of state: a signal for all those present to stand. The King or the Queen then proceeds to the throne, from where he delivers his Speech from the Throne. In his capacity of (formal) head of the Government he announces the plans for the new parliamentary year. The King's or the Queen's Speech is not written by the King, but by the Prime Minister and the cabinet.

When the Speech is finished, the President of the Senate proclaims "Leve de koning!" ("Long live the King!") or "Leve de koningin!" ("Long live the Queen!") which is answered by everyone present with "Hoera! Hoera! Hoera!" This brings an end to the joint session of the two houses. The ushers escort the King and members of the Royal House to the door. The president then closes the session.

When the monarch leaves the Ridderzaal, the escort of honour forms again in the Binnenhof, and the procession returns to Noordeinde Palace where he traditionally salutes the gathered crowd from the balcony.

== Proposal of the next year's budget ==
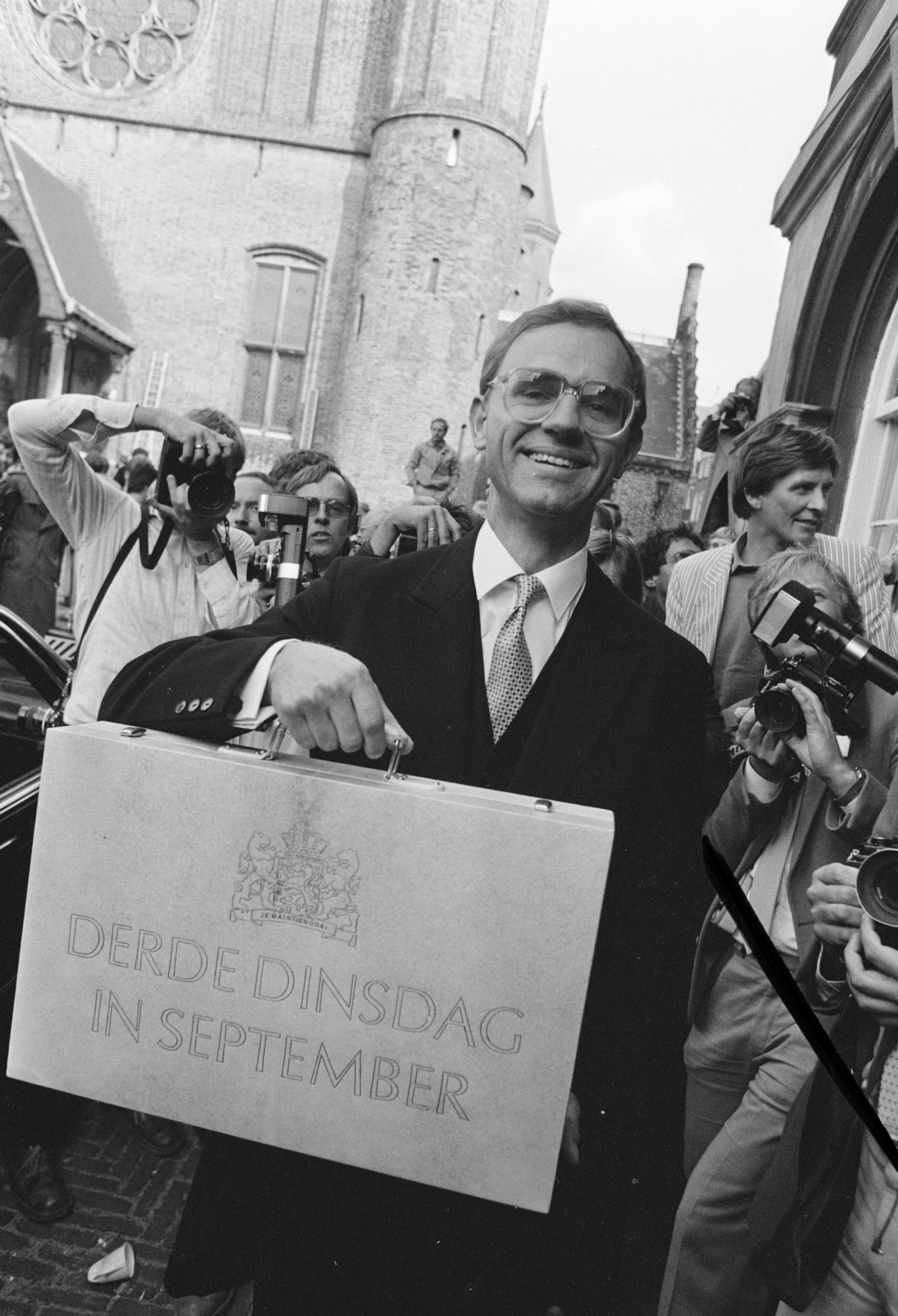
Minister of Finance Onno Ruding carrying the budget briefcase, Prinsjesdag 1983.

After lunch, the Minister of Finance proposes the next year's national budget and the Budget Memorandum (the Miljoenennota) to the House of Representatives. Since 1947, the budget is carried in a special briefcase, the current briefcase was made in 1964 and has printed on it in Dutch: "Third Tuesday of September". Due to the size of the case, it probably contains only a part of the entire memorandum.

=== General debates ===
The presentation is followed by a cycle of parliamentary debates on the budget. It starts with the general political debate (Dutch: algemene politieke beschouwingen), where the Prime Minister speaks on behalf of the government with parliamentary group leaders. A week later, the House debates with the minister and state secretaries of Finance during the general financial debate (Dutch: algemene financiële beschouwingen). Afterwards, the budget of every ministry is discussed in parliamentary committees. It is the most important moment for parliamentary policy making, as MPs can amend the budget to finance specific plans.

== History ==
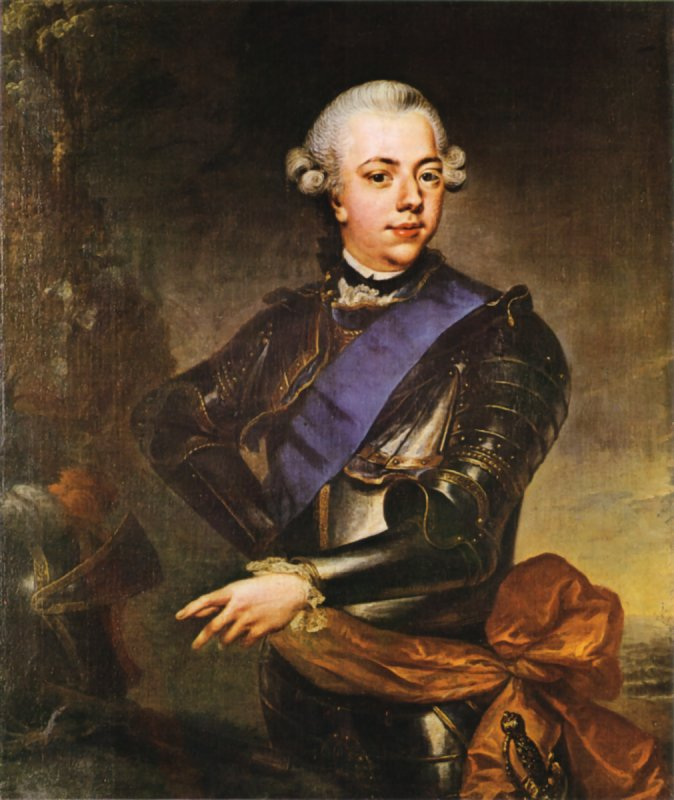
Johann Georg Ziesenis: William V, Prince of Orange (1748–1806). Prinsjesdag originally was the celebration of his birthday during his reign in the 18th century on March 8, then a public holiday.

In the 18th century, Prinsjesdag was one of the country's most popular public holidays and was originally used to celebrate the birthday of Prince William V on 8 March.

Between 1780 and 1797 — known as the Patriot era, leading up to the Batavian Revolution — the day was used for demonstrations of loyalty to the House of Orange, which is probably why the current name was chosen in the 19th century for the ceremonial opening of parliament.

Historically, the constitution has stated that the opening of parliament should take place on a fixed date. The opening of parliament was originally held on the first Monday in November in the first half of the 19th century, and then the third Monday in October, but when a constitutional revision introduced annual budgets in 1848, more time was needed to debate the budget, so the date was brought forward a month. Monday was considered inappropriate, because many parliamentarians in distant parts of the country needed to leave their homes on Sunday to make it to The Hague in time, so in 1887 Prinsjesdag was moved to Tuesday.

Throughout the years 1815 to 1904, the speech from the throne was given in the assembly room of the House of Representatives, but it was moved back to the Hall of Knights after an extensive restoration of the building at the start of the 20th century.

The pomp and circumstance is still very much part of the day.

== See also ==
- State of the Nation (disambiguation) – for similar speeches in other countries
