= Glass Coach (Dutch royal carriage) =

Dutch royal carriage

- Glazen Koets (Dutch)
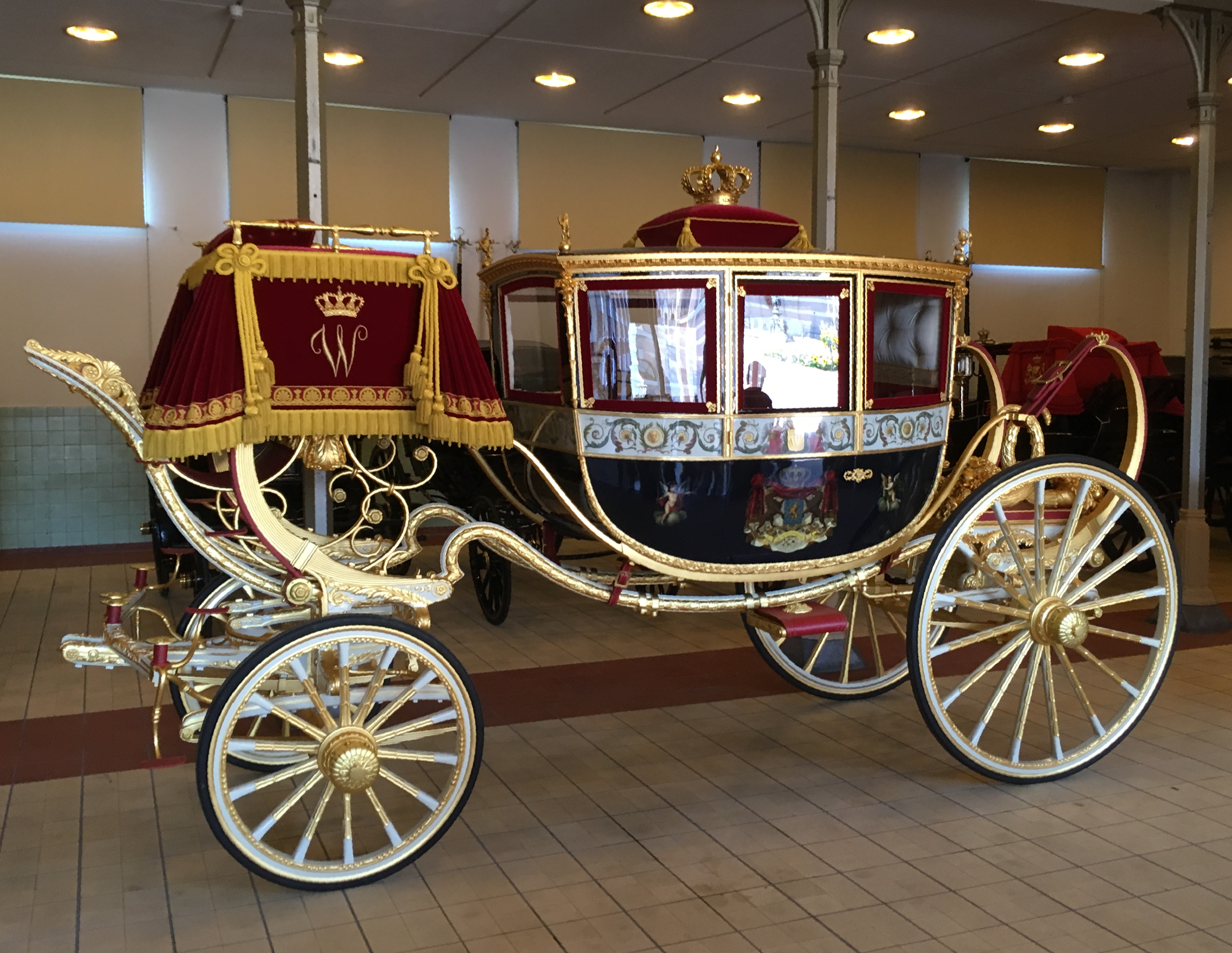
- Artist: Pierre Simons (coachbuilder)
- Completion date: 1826
- Type: Berlin coach
- Condition: Restored 2010–2015; in current ceremonial use
- Location: Royal Stables (Netherlands), The Hague
- Owner: Royal House of the Netherlands
- Website: Glazen Koets

The Glass Coach (Dutch: Glazen Koets) is a royal state coach used by the Dutch royal family for special events, and is the oldest carriage the Dutch royal family owns. It is stored at the Royal Stables in The Hague.

== Description ==
The coach is a Berlin type with seven glass windows. It is painted dark blue, edged with a broad cream-colored gilded frame decorated with laurel and oak leaf motifs. The royal coat of arms of the period is painted on the door. On the roof is a gilded wooden crown on a red cushion. The interior is upholstered in purple velvet and the ceiling lined with white silk.

When used by the monarch, the coach is traditionally drawn by eight horses.

== History ==
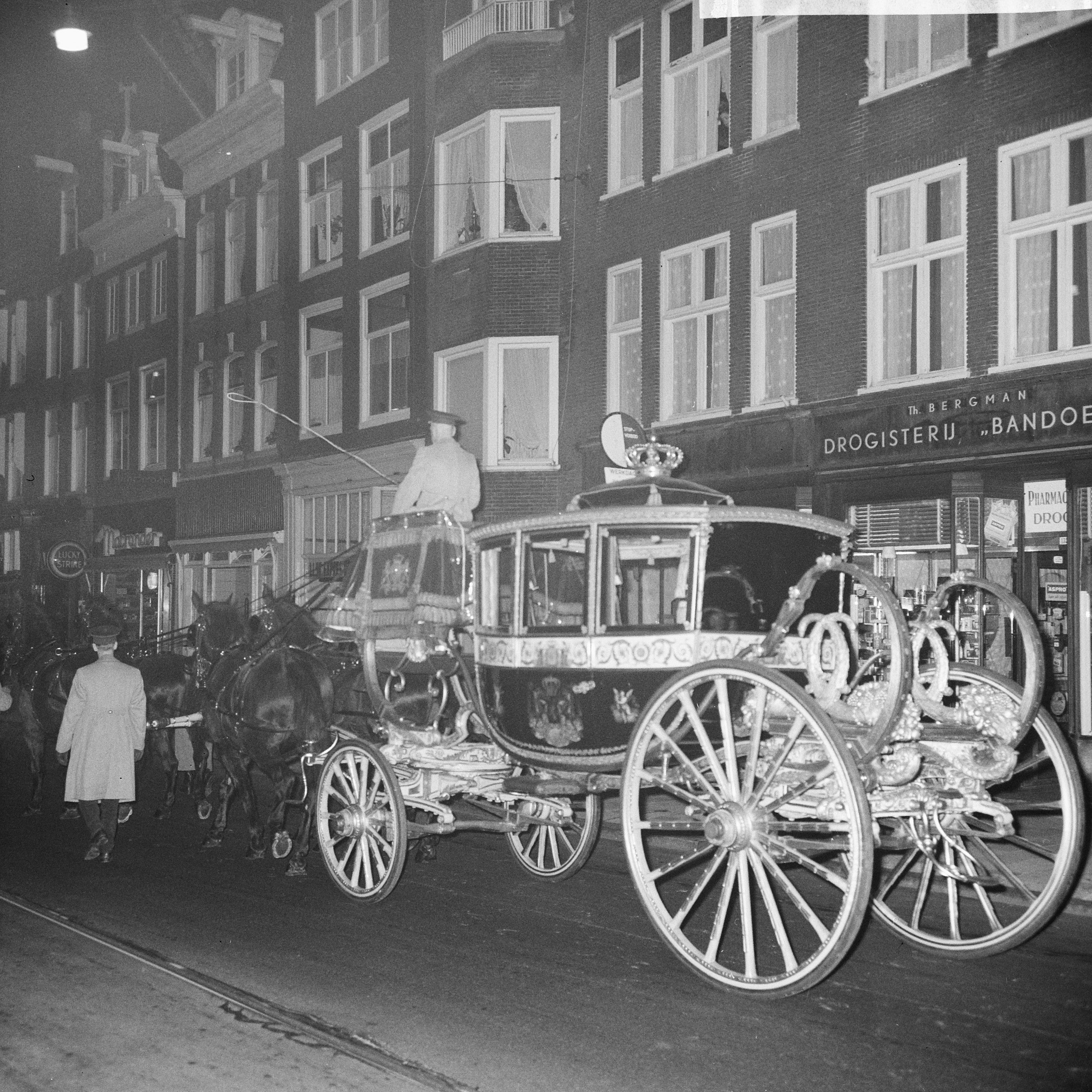
The Glass Coach during a nighttime rehearsal three days before the wedding of Princess Beatrix and Prince Claus in 1966

The Glass Coach was ordered in 1821 for King Willem I from coachbuilder Pierre Simons of Brussels and was delivered in 1826. It is the oldest coach the Dutch royal family owns.

During the Belgian Revolution of 1830, the coach was seized along with other possessions of the House of Orange. After the 1839 Treaty of London, the Dutch Master of the Horse traveled to Brussels, where several former royal carriages were being sold; he repurchased the Glass Coach and returned it to The Hague.

The Glass Coach remained in intermittent ceremonial use throughout the 19th and early 20th centuries. It was used for the inauguration of Queen Wilhelmina in 1898, and the funeral of Queen Emma in 1934. Queen Wilhelmina preferred it over the more ostentatious Golden Coach and continued to use it regularly on Prinsjesdag even after 1900. The coach has undergone periods of storage and reduced use as the Golden Coach became the primary royal state coach.

At royal weddings, the Glass Coach has historically carried the parents of the bride and groom, and was used in this role during the weddings of Princess Juliana in 1937 and Princess Beatrix in 1966.

The carriage was restored between 2010 and 2015.

== Modern use ==
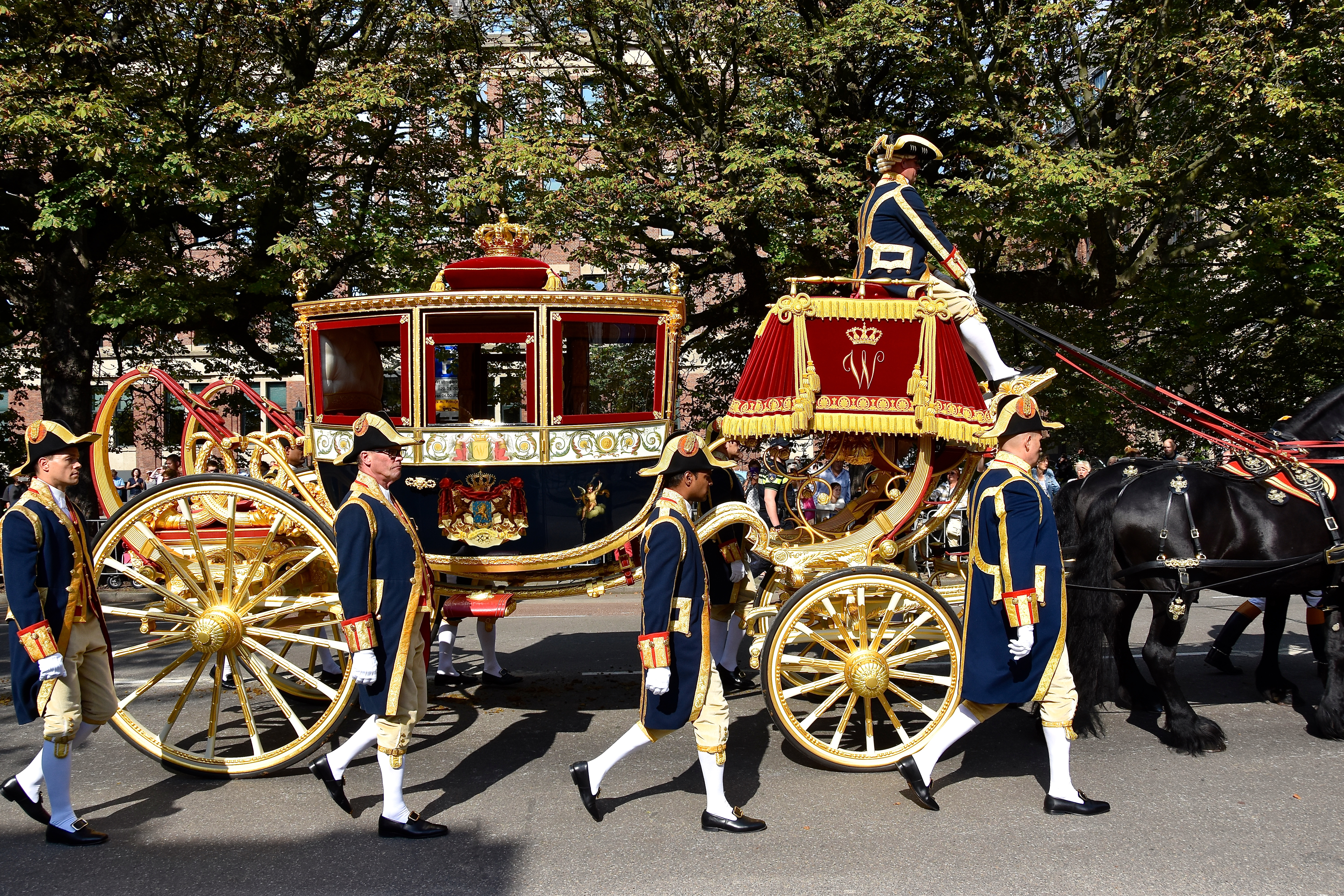
The Glass Coach in procession on Prinsjesdag in 2016

The Glass Coach is housed at the Royal Stables, and is still used for Dutch royal ceremonial occasions. After decades of limited use, it returned to Prinsjesdag service in 2016 when the Golden Coach was sent for restoration, and has served as the primary state coach since the Golden Coach was retired in 2022. In 2024, Princess Amalia accompanied her parents in the Glass Coach for the Prinsjesdag procession from Noordeinde Palace to the Royal Theatre in The Hague.

== See also ==
- Golden Coach (Netherlands)
- List of state coaches
