= Pict (disambiguation) =

The Picts were a group of Late Iron Age and Early Medieval Celtic people living in eastern and northern Scotland.

Pict or PICT may also refer to:

- Picts (Conan), inhabitants of the Pictish Wilderness, a region in the fictional world of Conan the Barbarian
- Pict (programming language), a statically typed programming language based on the π-calculus
- PICT, a graphics file format introduced on the original Apple Macintosh computer as its standard metafile format
- Paris Institute for Critical Thinking
- Parliamentary Information and Communication Technology Service
- Pittsburgh Irish and Classical Theatre
- Pollution-induced community tolerance
- Pune Institute of Computer Technology
- Pakistan International Container Terminal

== See also ==
- Several Species of Small Furry Animals Gathered Together in a Cave and Grooving with a Pict, a Pink Floyd track
- Pictones, a Gallic tribe dwelling south of the Loire river
