= List of legislatures in the United Kingdom =

The United Kingdom is a hybrid unitary constitutional monarchy with parliamentary government. The national legislature is located in London, which also serves as the sole legislature in the region of England. As a result of devolution in the United Kingdom, the regions of Scotland, Wales and Northern Ireland have their own autonomous legislatures. The Greater London urban area has the only local government legislature in the country.

== National ==
- Parliament of the United Kingdom, located at the Palace of Westminster in London.

== Scotland ==
- Scottish Parliament (Scottish Gaelic: Pàrlamaid na h-Alba), located in Holyrood, Edinburgh.

== Northern Ireland ==
- Northern Ireland Assembly (Irish Gaeilge: Tionól Thuaisceart Éireann), located at the Parliament Buildings in Belfast.

== Wales ==
- Senedd (Welsh Parliament; Welsh: Senedd Cymru), located at the Senedd building in Cardiff.

== Greater London ==
- London Assembly, located in City Hall, London.

== See also ==
- List of United States state legislatures
- Legislative assemblies of Canadian provinces and territories
- Parliaments of the Australian states and territories
