= Parliament of the United Kingdom =

Parliament of the United Kingdom of Great Britain and Northern Ireland
- 59th Parliament
- Logo used since 2018

Type
- Type: Bicameral
- Houses: House of Lords; House of Commons

History
- Established: 1 January 1801; 225 years ago
- Preceded by: Parliament of Great Britain; Parliament of Ireland

Leadership
- Monarch: King Charles III since 8 September 2022
- Lord Speaker: The Lord Forsyth of Drumlean since 2 February 2026
- Speaker of the Commons: Sir Lindsay Hoyle since 4 November 2019
- Prime Minister: Andy Burnham, Labour since 20 July 2026
- Leader of the Opposition: Kemi Badenoch, Conservative since 2 November 2024

Structure
- Seats: Lords: Not fixed (currently 796) (Note: This figure (correct as of 31 October 2026) excludes 19 peers who are on leave of absence or otherwise disqualified or suspended from sitting.); Commons: 650
- Lords political groups: Lords Spiritual: Bishops (25) (Note: The Lords Spiritual sit on the government benches in the House of Lords chamber and are so depicted in the diagram above, but do not form part of the government.); Lords Temporal HM Government: Labour Party (232) (Note: Including 15 Labour and Co-operative peers); HM Official Opposition: Conservative Party (247); Other groups: Liberal Democrats (79); Democratic Unionist Party (6); Ulster Unionist Party (3); Green Party of England and Wales (2); Plaid Cymru (2); Independents (1); Non-affiliated (44); Crossbench: Crossbenchers (154); Presiding officer: Lord Speaker (1)
- Commons political groups: HM Government: Labour Party (404) (Note: Including 43 MPs sponsored by the Co-operative Party, who are designated Labour and Co-operative); HM Official Opposition: Conservative Party (118); Other opposition: Liberal Democrats (71); Reform UK (8); Scottish National Party (8); Green Party of England and Wales (5); Democratic Unionist Party (4); Independent Alliance (4) (Note: Some sources group Independent Alliance MPs with other independent MPs, instead of treating the Independent Alliance as a separate group.); Plaid Cymru (4); Social Democratic and Labour Party (2) (Note: The SDLP is a sister party of the Labour Party, operating solely in Northern Ireland. The SDLP MPs sit on the government benches (with Labour), but do not take the Labour whip.); Your Party (2) (Note: Your Party has two declared MPs. Two MPs who sit for the Independent Alliance are also members of Your Party.); Alliance Party (1); Restore Britain (1); Traditional Unionist Voice (1); Ulster Unionist Party (1); Independents (8) (Note: MPs designated as independents may be elected as independents, leave the party for which they were elected, or be suspended from their party's whip. In the 2024 general election, six MPs were elected as independents, four of whom are currently members of the Independent Alliance and one of Your Party.); Presiding officer: Speaker (1); Abstentionists: Sinn Féin (7)
- Length of term: Commons: No longer than 5 years from first meeting (renewable). Lords: Life or tenure as a Diocesan Bishop.

Elections
- Lords voting system: Appointment by the Monarch, nominated by various processes
- Commons voting system: First-past-the-post
- Last Commons election: 4 July 2024
- Next Commons election: No later than 15 August 2029

Meeting place
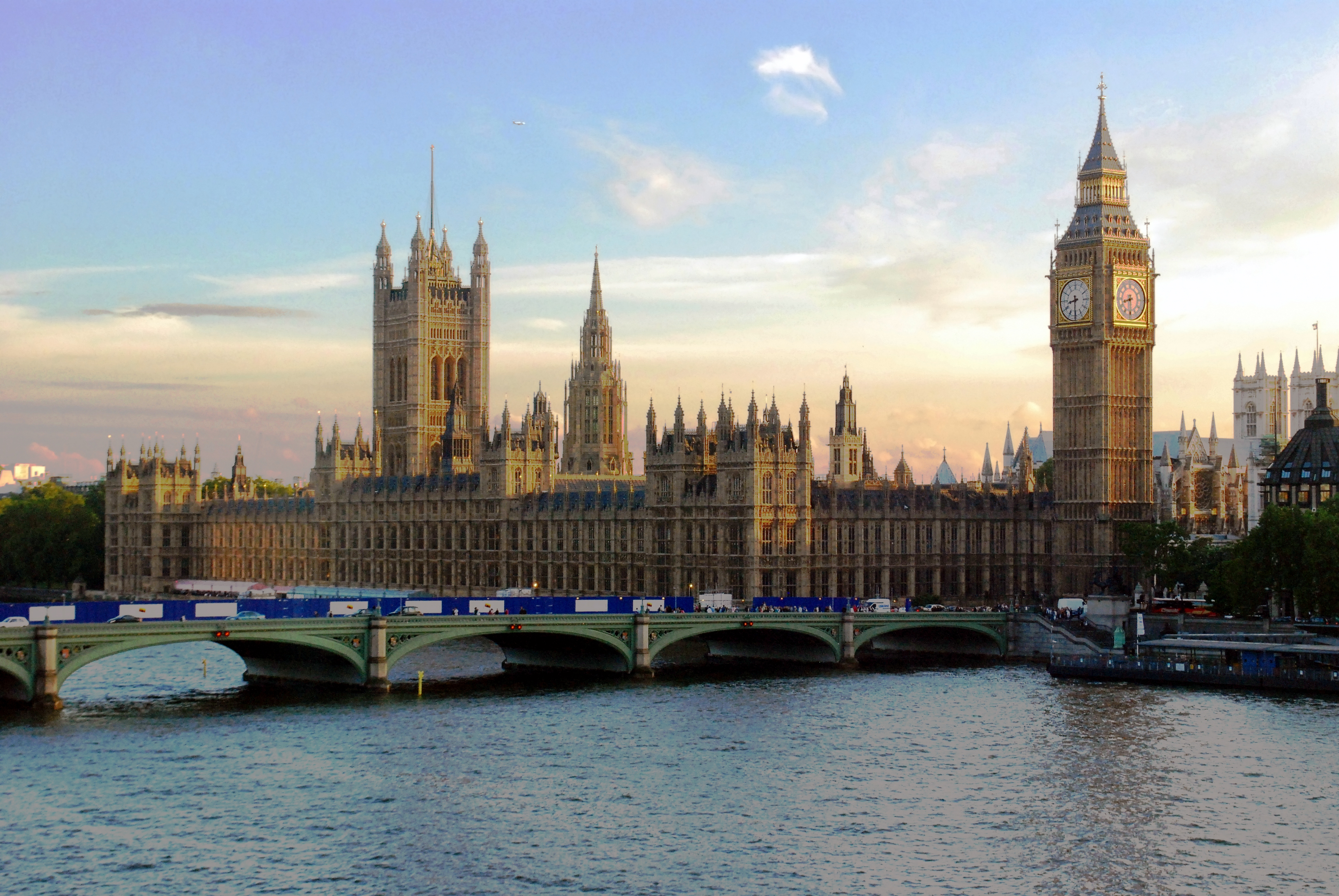
- Palace of Westminster; City of Westminster, London, United Kingdom; 51°29′58″N 0°07′29″W

Website
- www.parliament.uk

The Parliament of the United Kingdom of Great Britain and Northern Ireland is the supreme legislative body of the United Kingdom. It meets at the Palace of Westminster in London. It is bicameral, consisting of the House of Commons and the House of Lords, with the sovereign forming a third constitutional element. Acting together to legislate, these constitute the King-in-Parliament. Legislative authority has been devolved to the Scottish Parliament, Welsh Parliament, and Northern Ireland Assembly to differing degrees, while the UK Parliament retains authority to legislate in reserved matters and the power to legislate in devolved areas.

The House of Commons is the elected lower chamber, comprising 650 members elected from single-member constituencies using first-past-the-post voting. The House of Lords is the upper chamber and consists of the Lords Temporal, principally life peers, and the Lords Spiritual, bishops of the Church of England. The Commons has legislative primacy: under the Parliament Acts 1911 and 1949, the Lords can generally delay, rather than permanently block, legislation passed by the Commons. The government must retain the confidence of the House of Commons, and ministers are accountable to Parliament through debates, questions, and parliamentary committees.

The present Parliament was created on 1 January 1801 under the Acts of Union 1800, which created the Parliament of the United Kingdom of Great Britain and Ireland from the Parliament of Great Britain and the Parliament of Ireland. After the creation of the Irish Free State, the Royal and Parliamentary Titles Act 1927 changed its formal name to the Parliament of the United Kingdom of Great Britain and Northern Ireland. During the 19th and 20th centuries, successive reforms expanded the electoral franchise, altered representation in the Commons, and reduced the powers of the Lords and the role of hereditary peers. The House of Lords also formerly exercised judicial functions, which were transferred to the newly created Supreme Court of the United Kingdom in 2009.

Legislation normally requires passage by both houses and royal assent, although the Parliament Acts allow certain bills to become law without the consent of the Lords. A Parliament may last for a maximum of five years, but may be dissolved earlier under the Dissolution and Calling of Parliament Act 2022.

== History ==
The Parliament of Great Britain was formed in 1707 following the ratification of the Treaty of Union by Acts of Union passed by the Parliament of England and the Parliament of Scotland, with both Acts of Union stating in article I that the kingdoms of England and Scotland would on 1 May 1707 "and for ever after, be united into one Kingdom by the name of Great-Britain", with article III stating that the kingdom will be represented by a single Parliament, to be named the Parliament of Great-Britain. At the start of the 19th century, Parliament was further enlarged by Acts of Union ratified by the Parliament of Great Britain and the Parliament of Ireland, which abolished the latter and added 100 Irish MPs and 32 Lords to the former to create the Parliament of the United Kingdom of Great Britain and Ireland. The Royal and Parliamentary Titles Act 1927 formally amended the name to the "Parliament of the United Kingdom of Great Britain and Northern Ireland", five years after the secession of the Irish Free State.

Parliament meets in the Palace of Westminster, the same location as the English Parliament had met, and it has continued there up to the present. The House of Lords and House of Commons sit in their respective chambers, with exception following the 1834 fire and 1941 bombing during the Blitz which destroyed large parts of the chambers. During the reconstruction the Lords sat in the Painted Chamber and White Chamber while the Commons sat in the former Lords Chamber for 17 years following the fire until 1851. As the Commons Chamber was destroyed following the bombing, both houses met in the Church House annexe and then the Commons met to the Lords Chamber and the Lords met in the Robing Room for 9 years until 1950.

=== Parliament of the United Kingdom of Great Britain and Ireland ===
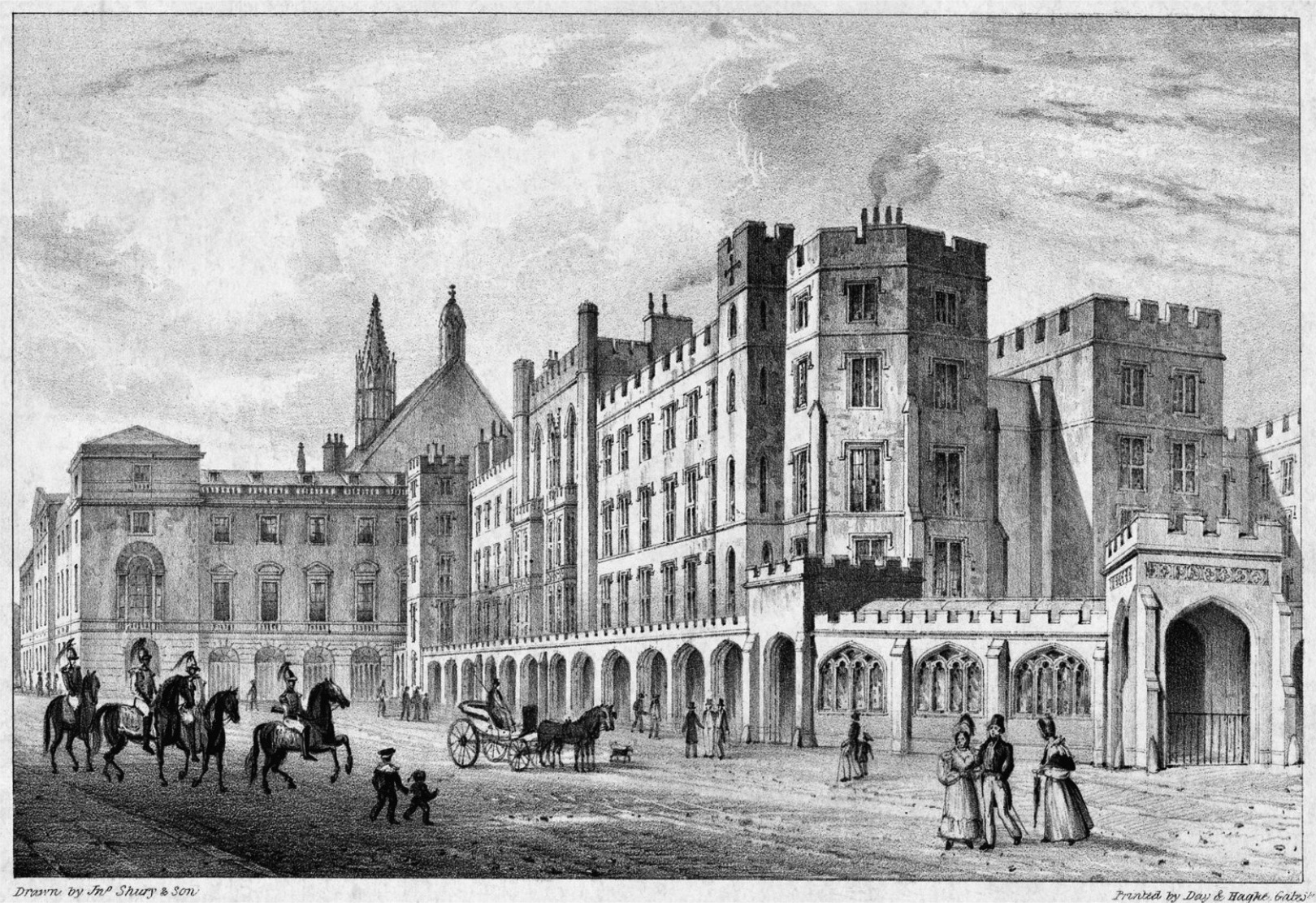
Print of the Palace of Westminster, before it burnt down in 1834

The United Kingdom of Great Britain and Ireland was created on 1 January 1801, by the merger of the Kingdoms of Great Britain and Ireland under the Acts of Union 1800. The principle of ministerial responsibility to the lower house (Commons) did not develop until the 19th century—the House of Lords was superior to the House of Commons both in theory and in practice. Members of the House of Commons (MPs) were elected in an antiquated electoral system, under which constituencies of vastly different sizes existed. Thus, the borough of Old Sarum, with seven voters, could elect two members, as could the borough of Dunwich, which had almost completely disappeared into the sea due to land erosion.

Many small constituencies, known as pocket or rotten boroughs, were controlled by members of the House of Lords (peers), who could ensure the election of their relatives or supporters. During the reforms of the 19th century, beginning with the Reform Act 1832, the electoral system for the House of Commons was progressively regularised. No longer dependent on the Lords for their seats, MPs grew more assertive.

The Chartist movement gained popularity at this time, formed mostly of emerging working class people advocating peacefully for reform. The People's Charter petition garnered millions of signatures and was presented to Parliament in 1838, 1842, and 1848 with the following demands:

- A vote for every man aged twenty-one years and above, of sound mind, and not undergoing punishment for a crime.
- The secret ballot to protect the elector in the exercise of his vote.
- No property qualification for Members of Parliament (MPs), to allow the constituencies to return the man of their choice.
- Payment of Members, enabling tradesmen, working men, or other persons of modest means to leave or interrupt their livelihood to attend to the interests of the nation.
- Equal constituencies, securing the same amount of representation for the same number of electors, instead of allowing less populous constituencies to have as much or more weight than larger ones.
- Annual parliamentary elections, thus presenting the most effectual check to bribery and intimidation, since no purse could buy a constituency under a system of universal manhood suffrage in every twelve months.

The Second Reform Act (1867), and Third Reform Act (1884) expanded the franchise gradually, and the adoption of all but the last of these demands came through:

- Representation of the People Act 1918 (gave the vote to all men over 21 as well as women over 30)
- Ballot Act 1872 (introduced secret ballots)
- Property Qualification for Members of Parliament Act 1858 (abolished property requirements for MPs)
- Parliament Act 1911 (Introduced payment for MPs, initially £400 annually)
- Redistribution of Seats Act 1885, Representation of the People Act 1948, and Redistribution of Seats Act 1949 (made equally populated constituencies, and later abolished multi-member constituencies)

The supremacy of the British House of Commons was reaffirmed in the early 20th century. In 1909, the Commons passed the "People's Budget", which made numerous changes to the taxation system which were detrimental to wealthy landowners. The House of Lords, which consisted mostly of powerful landowners, rejected the Budget. On the basis of the Budget's popularity and the Lords' consequent unpopularity, the Liberal Party narrowly won two general elections in 1910.

Using the result as a mandate, the Liberal Prime Minister, H. H. Asquith, introduced the Parliament Bill, which sought to restrict the powers of the House of Lords. (He did not reintroduce the land tax provision of the People's Budget.) When the Lords refused to pass the bill, Asquith threatened to get the King to create hundreds of Liberal peers, before the second general election of 1910, so as to erase the Conservative majority in the House of Lords. In the face of such a threat, the House of Lords narrowly passed the bill.

The Parliament Act 1911, as it became, prevented the Lords from blocking a money bill (a bill dealing with taxation), and allowed them to delay any other bill for a maximum of three sessions (reduced to two sessions in 1949), after which it could become law over their objections. However, regardless of the Parliament Acts of 1911 and 1949, the House of Lords has always retained the unrestricted power to veto any bill outright which attempts to extend the life of a parliament.

=== Parliament of the United Kingdom of Great Britain and Northern Ireland ===
The result of the 1918 general election in Ireland showed a landslide victory for the Irish republican party Sinn Féin, who vowed in their manifesto to establish an independent Irish Republic. Accordingly, Sinn Féin MPs, though ostensibly elected to sit in the House of Commons, refused to take their seats in Westminster, and instead assembled in 1919 to proclaim Irish independence and form a revolutionary unicameral parliament for the independent Irish Republic, called Dáil Éireann.

In 1920, in parallel to the Dáil, the Government of Ireland Act 1920 created home rule parliaments of Northern Ireland and Southern Ireland and reduced the representation of both parts at Westminster. The number of Northern Ireland seats was increased again after the introduction of direct rule in 1972.

The Irish republicans responded by declaring the elections to these home rule Parliaments, held on the same day in 1921, to be the basis of membership for a new Dáil Éireann.

The elections for the Northern Ireland House of Commons were contested and won by Unionist parties (40 seats to them, with 6 each to Nationalists and Sinn Féin). In Southern Ireland, as Nicholas Whyte notes at the Access Research Knowledge (ARK) site of Ulster and Queen's Universities, "[n]o polling took place... as all 128 seats were unopposed, 124 being won by Sinn Féin and the other four by Independent (ex-Unionist) candidates representing Dublin University (ie Trinity College)". Since only four MPs sat in the home rule Southern Irish parliament, with the remaining 124 being in the Republic's Second Dáil, the home rule parliament was adjourned sine die without ever having operated.

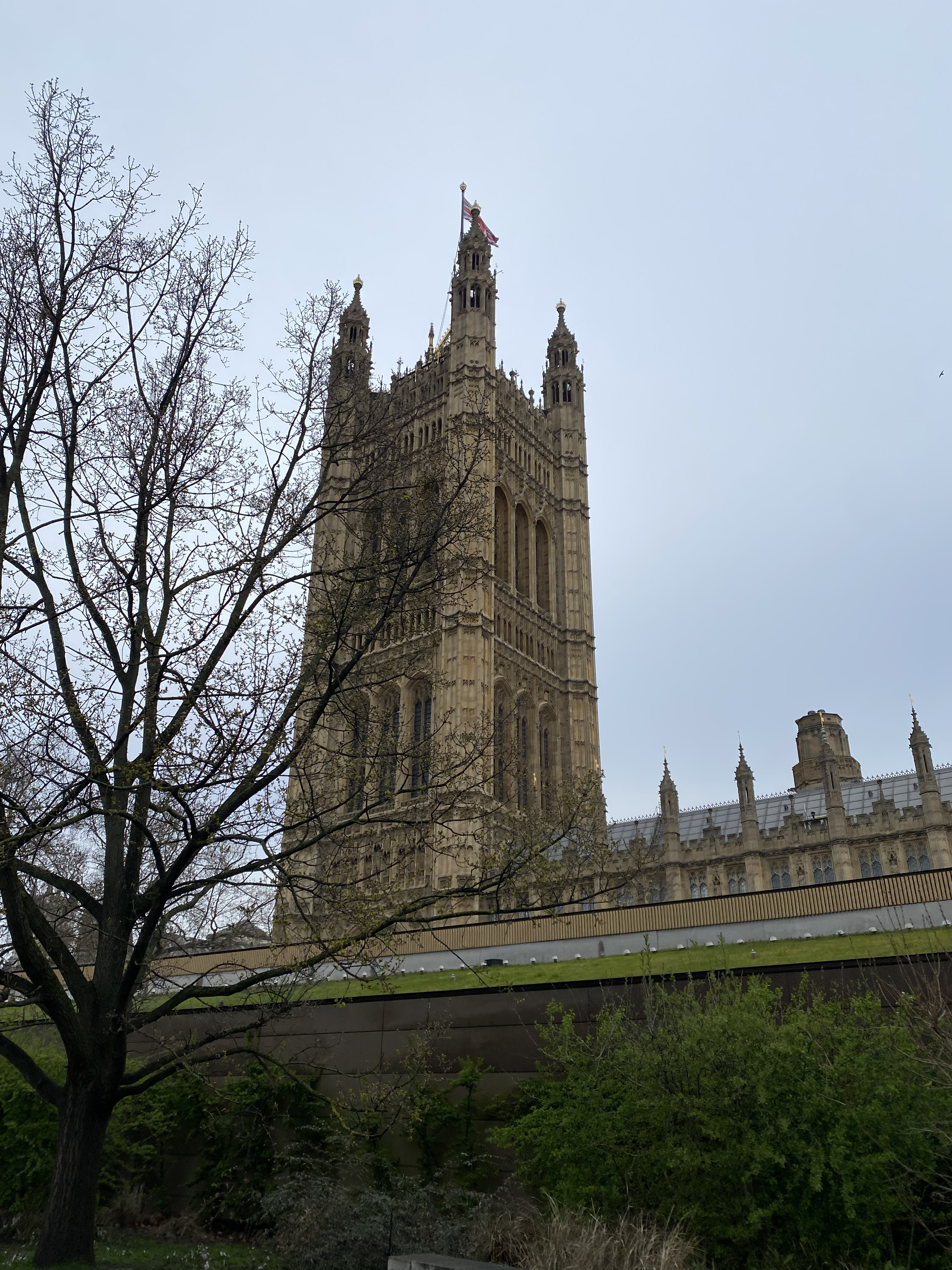
Victoria Tower in London

In 1921, pursuant to the Anglo-Irish Treaty, the revolutionary Irish Republic was replaced by the Irish Free State, recognised by the United Kingdom as a separate state (and thus, no longer represented in the Westminster Parliament). Northern Ireland would remain British, and in 1927, parliament was renamed the Parliament of the United Kingdom of Great Britain and Northern Ireland.

The Reform Act 1928 gave universal suffrage with a voting age of 21, and the Reform Act 1969 lowered the voting age to 18, making the United Kingdom one of the first major democratic countries to do so.

Further reforms to the House of Lords were made in the 20th century. The Life Peerages Act 1958 authorised the regular creation of life peerage dignities. By the 1960s, the regular creation of hereditary peerage dignities had ceased; thereafter, almost all new peers were life peers only.

The House of Lords Act 1999 removed the automatic right of hereditary peers to sit in the House of Lords, although it made an exception for 92 of them to be elected to life-terms by the other hereditary peers, with by-elections upon their death. The House of Lords is now a chamber that is subordinate to the House of Commons. Additionally, the Constitutional Reform Act 2005 led to abolition of the judicial functions of the House of Lords with the creation of the new Supreme Court of the United Kingdom in October 2009. As of 2026, there were no longer hereditary peers in the House of Lords, as a result of the House of Lords (Hereditary Peers) Bill.

== Composition and powers ==
=== Background ===
Under the UK's constitution, Parliament is the supreme legislative body of the state. In addition to making laws, the important functions of members of Parliament include representing the interests of the public and holding the government to account. Whilst the privy council can also issue legislation through orders-in-council, this power may be limited, like all other exercises of the royal prerogative.

The legislative authority, the King-in-Parliament, has three separate elements: the Monarch, the House of Lords, and the House of Commons. As a result, a bill must be passed by both houses (or just the House of Commons under the Parliament Act 1911) and receive royal assent for it to become law.

Executive powers (including those granted by legislation or forming part of the prerogative) are not formally exercised by Parliament itself. However, these powers are in practice exercised on the advice of government ministers, who must be drawn from and be accountable to the Parliament.

=== Monarch ===
Whilst the monarch is a constitutive element of parliament, they do not debate bills or otherwise contribute to political debate. Their royal assent is required for a bill to become law; however, this has not been refused since 1708 and is largely a formality. Assent is granted by the monarch (or counsellors of state) signing letters patent (affixed with the Great Seal of the Realm) prepared by the clerk of the Crown listing all bills passed by the houses of Parliament up to a certain date. To be complete, Parliament must be notified that assent has been given. Assent may also be granted in person by the monarch in the House of Lords; however, this has not happened since 1854. Alternatively, assent may be granted by royal commission, as commonly occurred before 1967 but now only occurs when bills are assented to before prorogation.

=== House of Lords ===
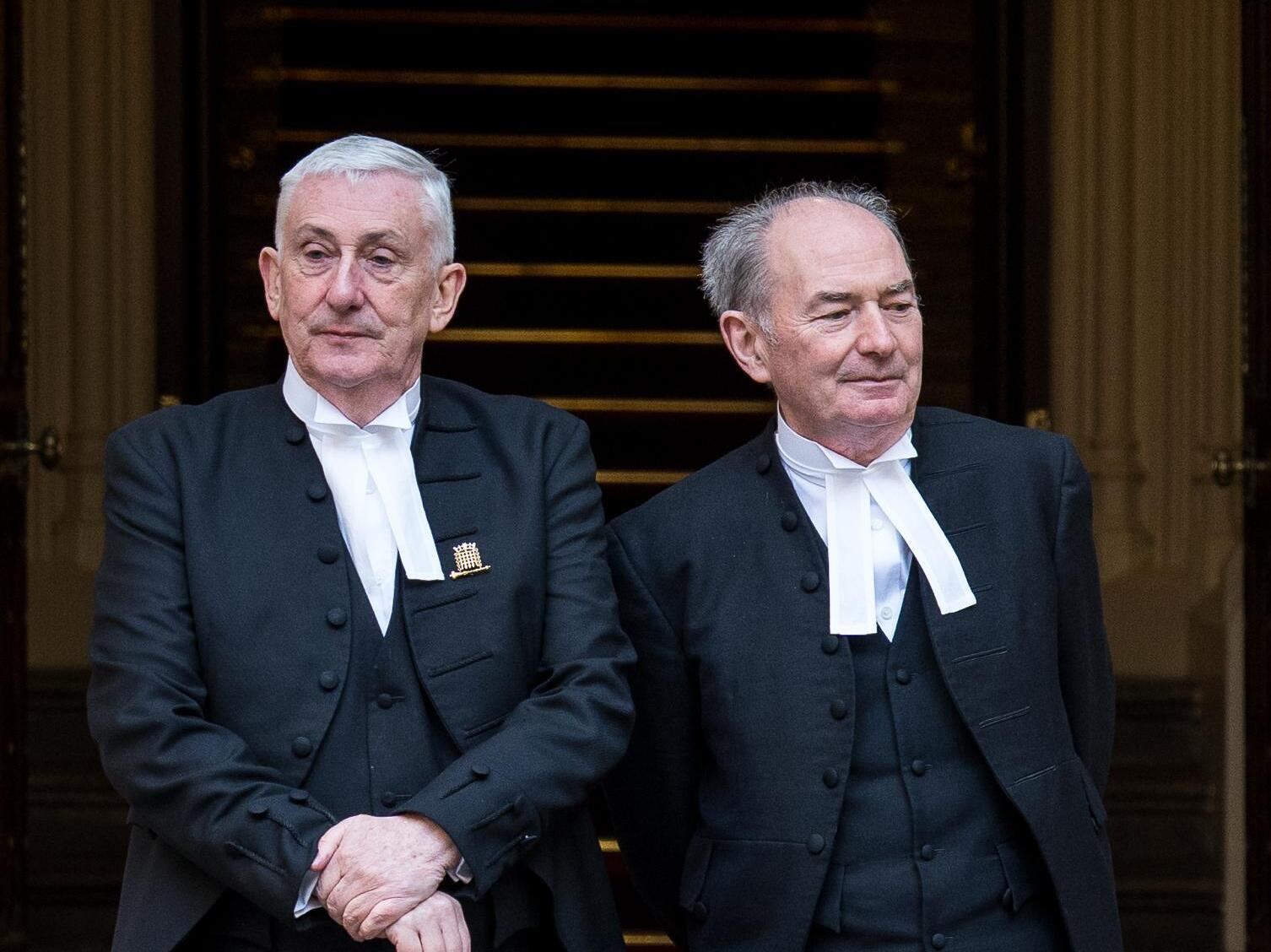
Two of the incumbent speakers of the Parliament, Speaker of the House of Commons Sir Lindsay Hoyle (left) and Lord Speaker The Lord Forsyth of Drumlean (right), March 2026

The House of Lords is known formally as "The Right Honourable The Lords Spiritual and Temporal in Parliament Assembled", the Lords Spiritual being bishops of the Church of England and the Lords Temporal being Peers of the Realm. The Lords Spiritual and Lords Temporal are considered separate "estates", but they sit, debate, and vote together.

The Parliament Acts 1911 and 1949 significantly reduced the legislative powers of the House of Lords relative to the House of Commons. Whilst the Lords debates and votes on all bills (except money bills), their refusal to pass a bill may only delay its passage for a maximum of two parliamentary sessions over a year. After this, the bill may receive royal assent and become law without the Lords' consent.

Like in the House of Commons, the House of Lords may scrutinise governments through asking questions to government ministers that sit in the Lords and through the operation of a small number of select committees.

The Lords used to also exercise judicial power and acted as the UK's supreme legislative court. Appeals were not heard by the whole body, but a committee of senior judges that were appointed to the Lords to act for this purpose. This power was lost when it was transferred to the newly created Supreme Court of the United Kingdom in 2009.

From time to time, and especially recently, arguments have been made suggesting the House of Lords is obsolete or unnecessary. In 2023, a commission led by former Prime Minister Gordon Brown stated that the existence of the House of Lords was "indefensible" and recommended that the Lords in its current form be abolished and replaced by an "Assembly of the Nations and Regions".

==== Lords Spiritual ====
The Lords Spiritual of the Lords' currently consists of the archbishops of Canterbury and York, the bishops of London, Durham and Winchester (who sit by right regardless of seniority) and 21 other diocesan bishops of the Church of England, ranked in order of consecration, subject to women being preferred if one is eligible from 2015 to 2030 under the Lords Spiritual (Women) Act 2015 and the Lords Spiritual (Women) Act 2015 (Extension) Act 2025. Formerly, the Lords Spiritual included all of the senior clergymen of the Church of England—archbishops, bishops, abbots and mitred priors.

==== Lords Temporal ====
The Lords Temporal consists all life peers appointed under the Life Peerages Act 1958. Life peers are appointed by the monarch, on the advice of the prime minister.

=== House of Commons ===
As of 2026, the House consists of 650 members; this total includes the Speaker, who by convention renounces partisan affiliation and does not take part in debates or votes, as well as three Deputy Speakers, who also do not participate in debates or votes but formally retain their party membership. Each Member of Parliament (MP) is chosen by a single constituency by the First-Past-the-Post electoral system. There are 650 constituencies in the United Kingdom, each made up of an average of 73,000 voters, as of 2024. The First-Past-the-Post system means that every constituency elects one MP each. Each voter assigns one vote for one candidate, and the candidate with the most votes in each constituency is elected as MP to represent their constituency. Members sit for a maximum of five years, although elections are generally called before that maximum limit is reached.

A party needs to win 326 constituencies (known as "seats") to win a majority in the House of Commons. If no party achieves a majority, then a situation of no overall control occurs – commonly known as a "Hung Parliament". In case of a Hung Parliament, the party with the most seats has the opportunity to form a coalition with other parties, so their combined seat tally extends past the 326-seat majority.

The House of Commons is the most powerful of the components of Parliament, particularly due to its sole right to determine taxation and the supply of money to the government. Additionally, the prime minister and leader of the government sits in the House, having acquired this position by virtue of having the confidence of the other members. This also means that the House is also the primary location in which the government faces scrutiny, as expressed through Question Time and the work of various select committees.

== State Opening of Parliament ==
The State Opening of Parliament is an annual event that marks the commencement of a session of the Parliament of the United Kingdom; it is held in the House of Lords Chamber.

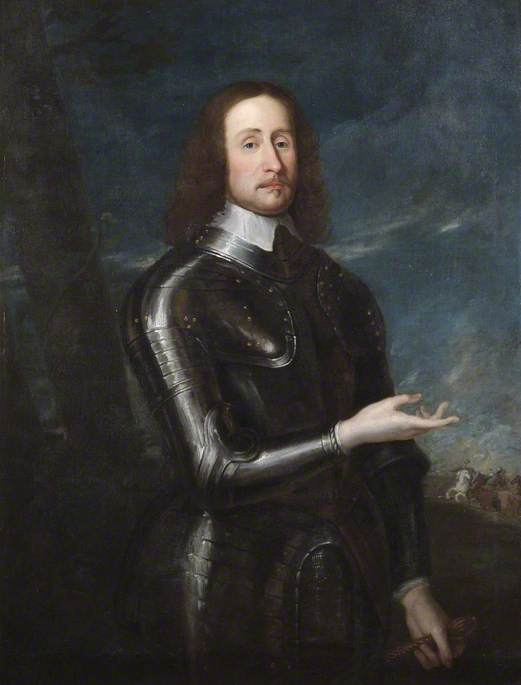
Leading 17th-century Parliamentarian John Hampden is one of the Five Members annually commemorated.

The tradition for the State Opening of the Parliament arises from events in 1642, when King Charles I entered the House of Commons with force, with intent to arrest a group termed the Five Members, John Hampden, John Pym, Denzil Holles, Arthur Haselrig (Hesilrige) and William Strode, Puritans who, with others, the King believed had encouraged the Scots to invade England, and who were otherwise intent on turning the English against him. (Note: Charles, his nephew Charles I Louis, the King's retainer, Robert Ker, 1st Earl of Roxburghe, and about eighty men at arms with sword and pistol, together entered the lobby of the House in that year. All remained there while the two royal Charles entered the Commons chamber, while Roxburghe propped open the chamber doors so that members could see the armed troops.) The actions of the King in 1642 sparked the English Civil War.The wars established the constitutional rights of Parliament, a concept legally established in the Glorious Revolution in 1688 and the subsequent Bill of Rights in 1689. Since then, no British monarch has entered the House of Commons when it is in session.

As Chisholm's 1911 "Black Rod" article notes, "Indignant at this breach of privilege, the House of Commons has ever since maintained its right of freedom of speech and uninterrupted debate by the closing of the doors on the king's representative", a traditional prerogative acted out by an official of the House of Lords, the "Gentleman Usher of the Black Rod", or more simply, "Black Rod", whose service dates to 1350. The Black Rod serves in several roles, including as "a personal attendant of the sovereign in the Upper House", and it is this duty that "brings him... into prominence" in his "summoning the Commons and their speaker to the Upper House to hear a speech from the throne", a ceremony that serves to open Parliament.

In the ceremony, upon signal of the Monarch, the Lord Great Chamberlain raises their wand of office to signal to Black Rod, who is charged with summoning the House of Commons and has been waiting in the Commons lobby. Black Rod turns, and under the escort of the Door-keeper of the House of Lords and an inspector of police, approaches the doors to the Chamber of the Commons. Attendants of the Commons chamber, aware of his approach, close the doors in his face, symbolising the rights of parliament and its independence from the monarch; as Chisholm summarises, "Black Rod then strikes three times with his staff, and on being asked 'Who is there?' replies 'Black Rod.'" He is then admitted, and advances to the bar in the chamber, makes traditional obeisances, and then addresses the Speaker, stating, "the King commands this honourable House to attend his majesty immediately in the House of Lords."

The ceremony continues with the monarch reading a speech, known as the Speech from the Throne, which is prepared by the Prime Minister and the Cabinet, outlining the Government's agenda for the coming year. The speech reflects the legislative agenda for which the Government intends to seek the agreement of both houses of Parliament.

After the monarch leaves, each House considers a bill pro forma to symbolise their right to deliberate independently of the monarch; in the House of Lords, the bill is called the Select Vestries Bill, while the Commons equivalent is the Outlawries Bill.

== Legislative procedure ==
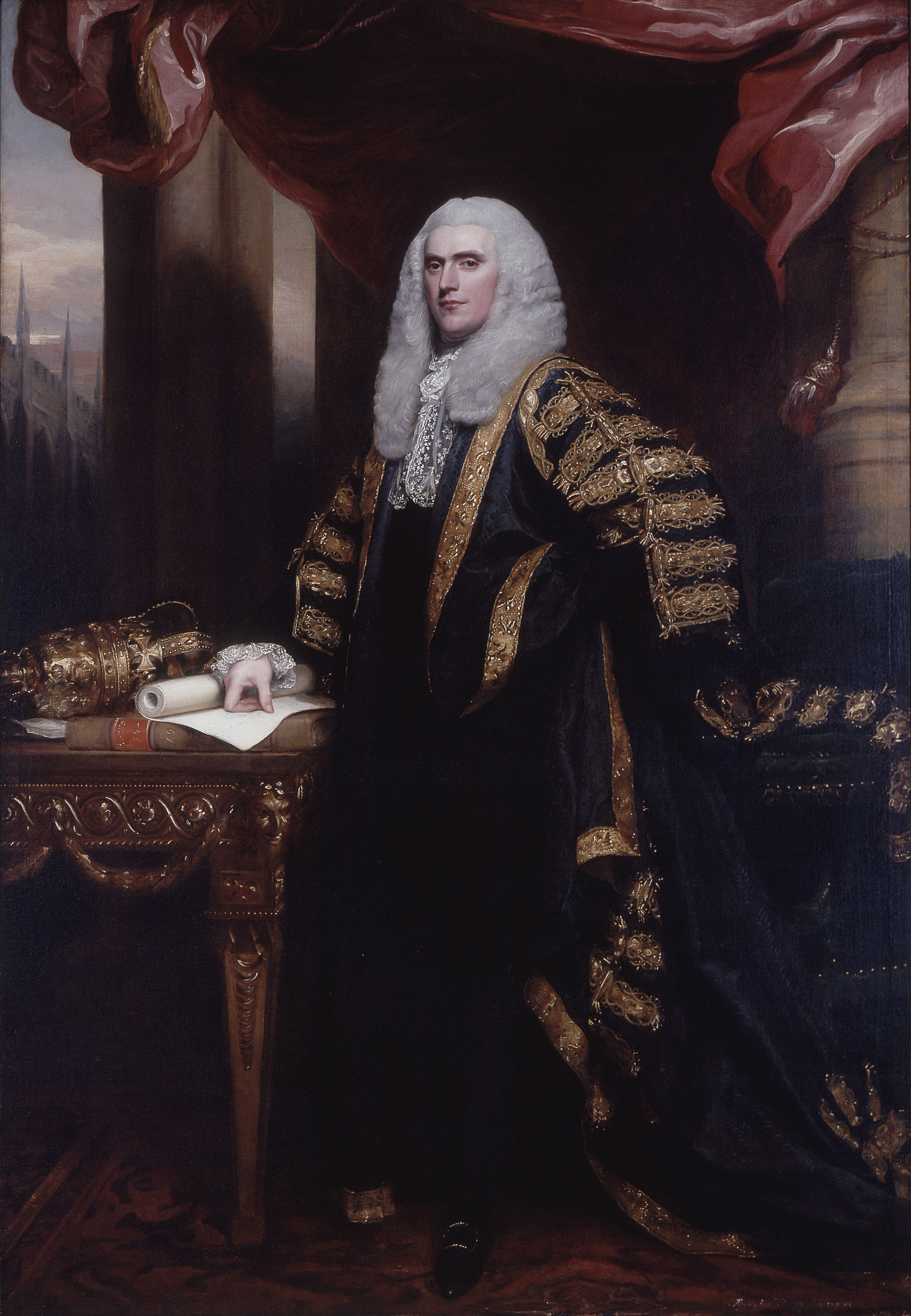
Henry Addington in state robes. Portrait by John Singleton Copley, 1797–98.

See also the stages of a bill section in Acts of Parliament in the United Kingdom.

Both houses of the British Parliament are presided over by a speaker, the Speaker of the House for the Commons and the Lord Speaker in the House of Lords. For the Commons, the approval of the Sovereign is required before the election of the Speaker becomes valid, but it is, by modern convention, always granted. The Speaker's place may be taken by the Chairman of Ways and Means, or by other Deputy Speakers.

Prior to July 2006, the House of Lords was presided over by a Lord Chancellor (a Cabinet member), whose influence as Speaker was very limited (whilst the powers belonging to the Speaker of the House of Commons are vast). However, as part of the Constitutional Reform Act 2005, the position of Speaker of the House of Lords (as it is termed in the Act) was separated from the office of Lord Chancellor (the office which has control over the judiciary as a whole), though the Lords remain largely self-governing. Decisions on points of order and on the disciplining of unruly members are made by the whole body, but by the Speaker alone in the Lower House. Speeches in the House of Lords are addressed to the House as a whole (using the words "My Lords"), but those in the House of Commons are addressed to the Speaker alone (using "Mr Speaker" or "Madam Speaker"). Speeches may be made to both houses simultaneously.

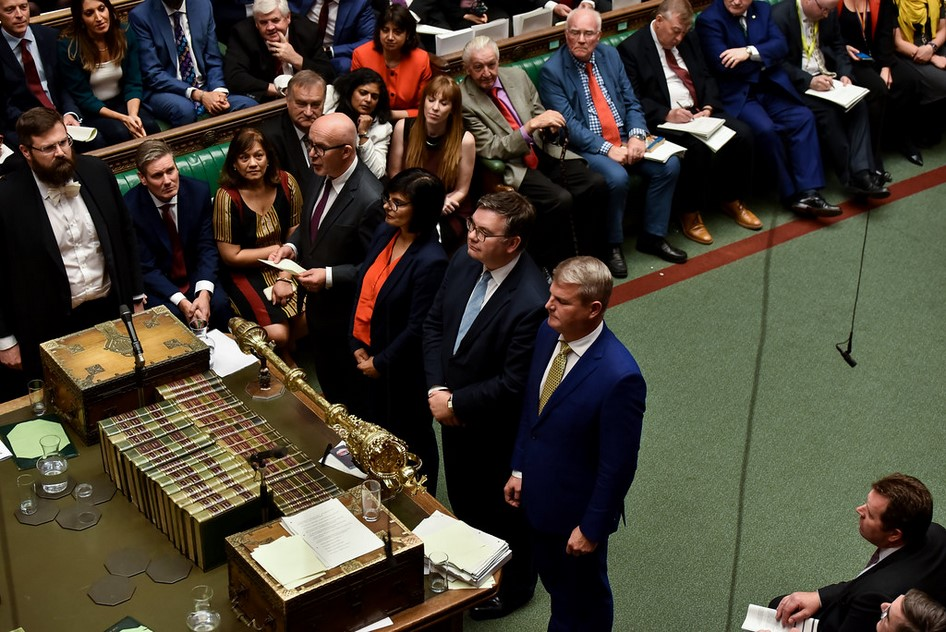
Announcement of the Second Letwin Amendment voting result in the House of Commons, 19 October 2019

Both houses may decide questions by voice vote; members shout out "Aye!" and "No!" in the Commons—or "Content!" and "Not-Content!" in the Lords—and the presiding officer declares the result. The pronouncement of either Speaker may be challenged, and a recorded vote (known as a division) demanded. (The Speaker of the House of Commons may choose to overrule a frivolous request for a division, but the Lord Speaker does not have that power.) In each House, a division requires members to file into one of the two lobbies alongside the Chamber; their names are recorded by clerks, and their votes are counted as they exit the lobbies to re-enter the Chamber. The Speaker of the House of Commons is expected to be non-partisan, and does not cast a vote except in the case of a tie; the Lord Speaker, however, votes along with the other Lords. Speaker Denison's rule is a convention that concerns how the Speaker should vote should he be required to break a tie.

== Duration ==
Originally there was no fixed limit on the length of a Parliament, but the Triennial Act 1694 set the maximum duration at three years. As the frequent elections were deemed inconvenient, the Septennial Act 1715 extended the maximum to seven years, but the Parliament Act 1911 reduced it to five. During the Second World War, the term was temporarily extended to ten years by Acts of Parliament. Since the end of the war the maximum has remained five years. Modern Parliaments, however, rarely continued for the maximum duration; normally, they were dissolved earlier. For instance, the 52nd, which assembled in 1997, was dissolved after four years. The Septennial Act was repealed by the Fixed-term Parliaments Act 2011, which established a presumption that a Parliament will last for five years, unless two thirds of the House of Commons votes for an early general election, or the government loses the confidence of the House. This was repealed by the Dissolution and Calling of Parliament Act 2022, which restored the ability for the government to call an early election while keeping five year terms.

Summary history of terms of the Parliament of the United Kingdom

Year	Term (years)	Act	Notes
1707	3 (maximum)	Ratification of the Acts of Union	Formation of Parliament of Great Britain.
1715	7 (maximum)	Septennial Act 1715	Maximum 7-year duration of Parliament. Parliament to be dissolved before the seventh anniversary of its first sitting.
1801	7 (maximum)	Acts of Union 1800	Formation of Parliament of United Kingdom.
1911	5 (maximum)	Parliament Act 1911	Maximum 5-year duration of Parliament. Parliament to be dissolved before the fifth anniversary of its first sitting.
Second World War	10	Various Acts of Parliament	Maximum 5-year duration of Parliament extended by the Prolongation of Parliament Act 1940, Prolongation of Parliament Act 1941, Prolongation of Parliament Act 1942, Prolongation of Parliament Act 1943 and Prolongation of Parliament Act 1944; each Act of Parliament extended the maximum duration of Parliament for another year.
Post-WW2	5 (maximum)	Parliament Act 1911	Maximum 5-year duration of Parliament. Parliament to be dissolved before the fifth anniversary of its first sitting.
2011	5	Fixed-term Parliaments Act 2011	Five-year interval between ordinary general elections. General elections were scheduled to take place on the first Thursday in May in every fifth year or the first Thursday in May on the fourth year if the previous election took place before the first Thursday in May, unless one of two situations arises, mentioned below.
2022	5 (maximum)	Dissolution and Calling of Parliament Act	Parliament automatically dissolves at the beginning of the day, which is the fifth anniversary of the day on which it first met unless dissolved earlier.

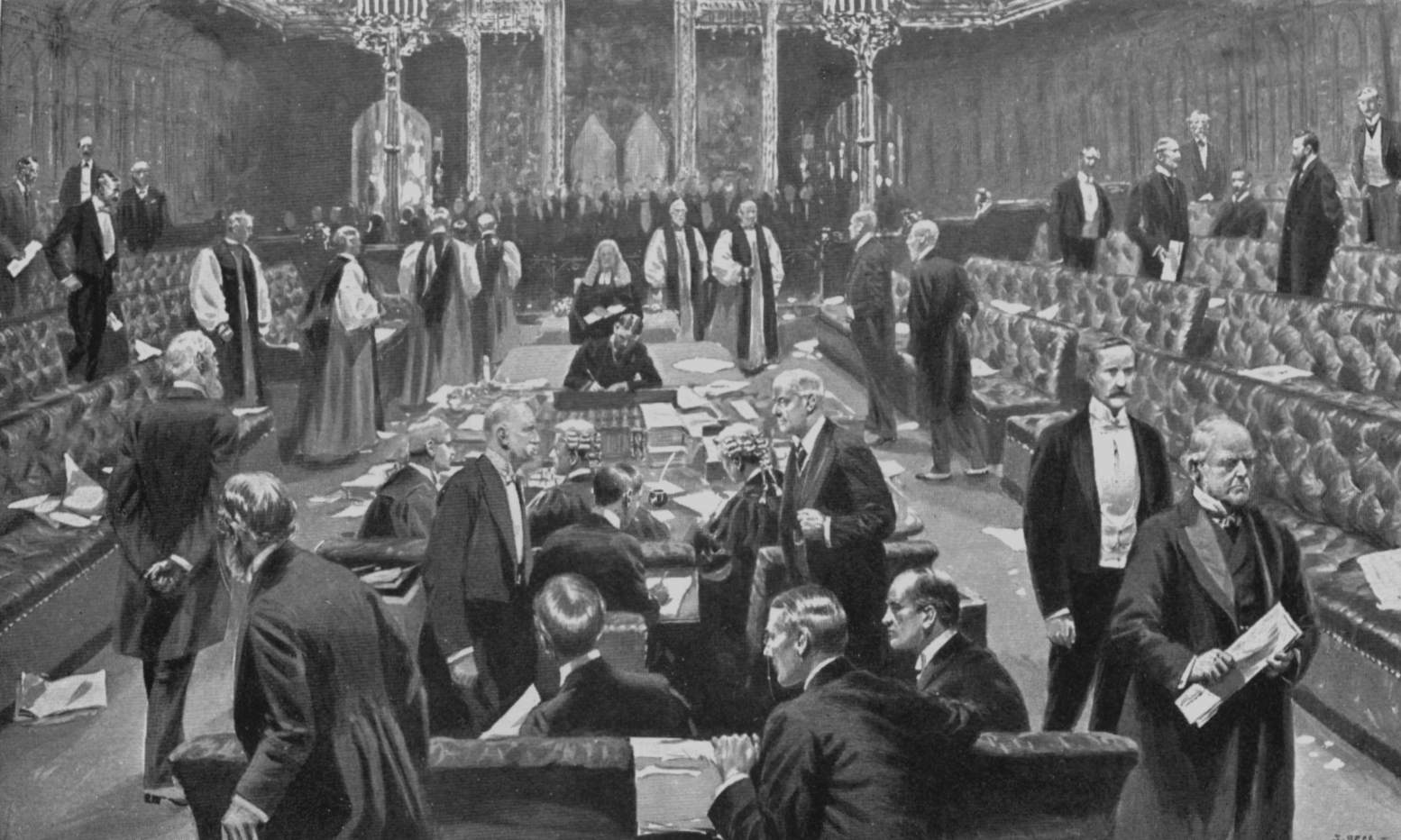
Passing of the Parliament Bill, 1911

Following a general election, a new Parliamentary session begins. Parliament is formally summoned 40 days in advance by the Sovereign, who is the source of parliamentary authority. On the day indicated by the Sovereign's proclamation, the two houses assemble in their respective chambers. The Commons are then summoned to the House of Lords, where Lords Commissioners (representatives of the Sovereign) instruct them to elect a Speaker. The Commons perform the election; on the next day, they return to the House of Lords, where the Lords Commissioners confirm the election and grant the new Speaker the royal approval in the Sovereign's name.

The business of Parliament for the next few days of its session involves the taking of the oaths of allegiance. Once a majority of the members have taken the oath in each House, the State Opening of Parliament may take place. The Lords take their seats in the House of Lords Chamber, the Commons appear at the Bar (at the entrance to the Chamber), and the Sovereign takes the seat on the throne. The Sovereign then reads the Speech from the Throne—the content of which is determined by the Ministers of the Crown—outlining the Government's legislative agenda for the upcoming year. Thereafter, each House proceeds to the transaction of legislative business.

By custom, before considering the Government's legislative agenda, a bill is introduced pro forma in each House—the Select Vestries Bill in the House of Lords and the Outlawries Bill in the House of Commons. These bills do not become laws; they are ceremonial indications of the power of each House to debate independently of the Crown. After the pro forma bill is introduced, each House debates the content of the Speech from the Throne for several days. Once each House formally sends its reply to the Speech, legislative business may commence, appointing committees, electing officers, passing resolutions and considering legislation.

A session of Parliament is brought to an end by a prorogation. There is a ceremony similar to the State Opening, but much less well known to the general public. Normally, the Sovereign does not personally attend the prorogation ceremony in the House of Lords and is represented by Lords Commissioners. The next session of Parliament begins under the procedures described above, but it is not necessary to conduct another election of a Speaker or take the oaths of allegiance afresh at the beginning of such subsequent sessions. Instead, the State Opening of Parliament proceeds directly. To avoid the delay of opening a new session in the event of an emergency during the long summer recess, Parliament is no longer prorogued beforehand, but only after the houses have reconvened in the autumn; the State Opening follows a few days later.

Each Parliament comes to an end, after a number of sessions, in anticipation of a general election. Parliament is dissolved by virtue of the Dissolution and Calling of Parliament Act 2022 and previously the Fixed-term Parliaments Act 2011. Prior to that, dissolution was effected by the Sovereign, always on the advice of the Prime Minister. The Prime Minister could seek dissolution at a time politically advantageous to their party. If the Prime Minister loses the support of the House of Commons, Parliament will dissolve and a new election will be held. Parliaments can also be dissolved if two-thirds of the House of Commons votes for an early election.

Formerly, the demise of the Sovereign automatically brought a Parliament to an end, the Crown being seen as the caput, principium, et finis (beginning, basis and end) of the body, but this is no longer the case. The first change was during the reign of William and Mary, when it was seen to be inconvenient to have no Parliament at a time when succession to the Crown could be disputed, and an Act was passed that provided that a Parliament was to continue for six months after the death of a Sovereign, unless dissolved earlier. Under the Representation of the People Act 1867 Parliament can now continue for as long as it would otherwise have done in the event of the death of the Sovereign.

After each Parliament concludes, the Crown issues writs to hold a general election and elect new members of the House of Commons, though membership of the House of Lords does not change.

== Legislative functions ==
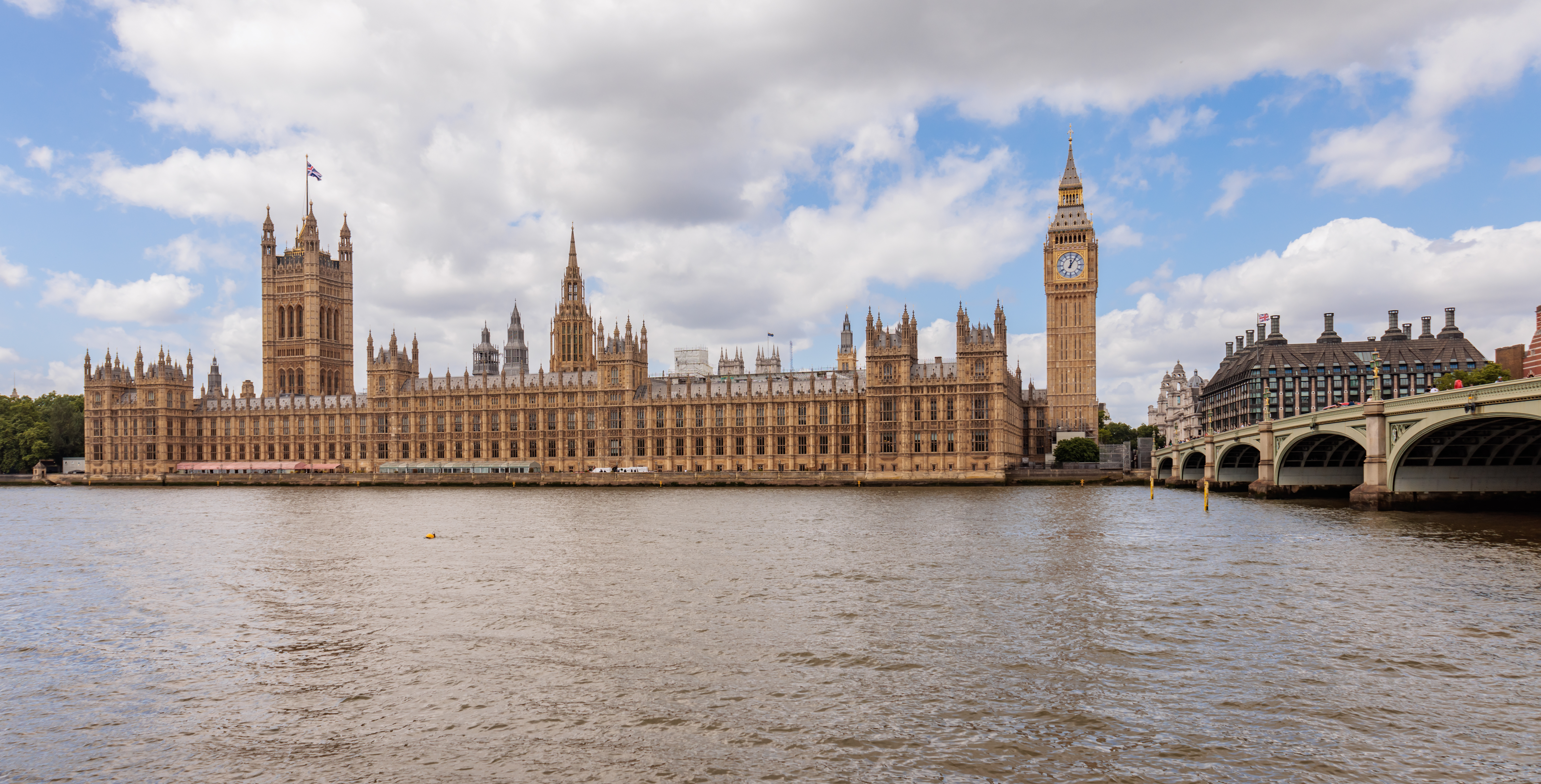
The Palace of Westminster, where Parliament meets

Laws can be made by Acts of the United Kingdom Parliament. While Acts can apply to the whole of the United Kingdom including Scotland, due to the continuing separation of Scots law many Acts do not apply to Scotland and may be matched either by equivalent Acts that apply to Scotland alone or, since 1999, by legislation set by the Scottish Parliament relating to devolved matters.

This has led to a paradox known as the West Lothian question. The existence of a devolved Scottish Parliament means that while Westminster MPs from Scotland may vote directly on matters that affect English constituencies, they may not have much power over their laws affecting their own constituency. Since there is no devolved "English Parliament", the converse is not true. Any Act of the Scottish Parliament may be overturned, amended or ignored by Westminster under section 35 of the Scotland Act 1998, and this happened for the first time in January 2023, when the Gender Recognition Reform (Scotland) Bill was prohibited from receiving royal assent. Legislative Consent Motions enables the UK Parliament to vote on issues normally devolved to Scotland, Wales or Northern Ireland, as part of United Kingdom legislation.

Laws, in draft form known as bills, may be introduced by any member of either House. A bill introduced by a Minister is known as a "Government Bill"; one introduced by another member is called a "Private Member's Bill". A different way of categorising bills involves the subject. Most bills, involving the general public, are called "public bills". A bill that seeks to grant special rights to an individual or small group of individuals, or a body such as a local authority, is called a "Private Bill". A Public Bill which affects private rights (in the way a Private Bill would) is called a "Hybrid Bill", although those that draft bills take pains to avoid this.

Private Members' Bills make up the majority of bills, but are far less likely to be passed than government bills. There are three methods for an MP to introduce a Private Member's Bill. The Private Members' Ballot (once per Session) put names into a ballot, and those who win are given time to propose a bill. The Ten Minute Rule is another method, where MPs are granted ten minutes to outline the case for a new piece of legislation. Standing Order 57 is the third method, which allows a bill to be introduced without debate if a day's notice is given to the Table Office. Filibustering is a danger, as an opponent of a bill can waste much of the limited time allotted to it. Private Members' Bills have no chance of success if the current government opposes them, but they are used in moral issues: the bills to decriminalise homosexuality and abortion were Private Members' Bills, for example. Governments can sometimes attempt to use Private Members' Bills to pass things it would rather not be associated with. "Handout bills" are bills which a government hands to MPs who win Private Members' Ballots.

Each Bill goes through several stages in each House. The first stage, called the first reading, is a formality. At the second reading, the general principles of the bill are debated, and the House may vote to reject the bill, by not passing the motion "That the Bill be now read a second time." Defeats of Government Bills in the Commons are extremely rare, the last being in 2005, and may constitute a motion of no confidence. (Defeats of Bills in the Lords never affect confidence and are much more frequent.)

Following the second reading, the bill is sent to a committee. In the House of Lords, the Committee of the Whole House or the Grand Committee are used. Each consists of all members of the House; the latter operates under special procedures, and is used only for uncontroversial bills. In the House of Commons, the bill is usually committed to a Public Bill Committee, consisting of between 16 and 50 members, but the Committee of the Whole House is used for important legislation. Several other types of committees, including Select Committees, may be used, but rarely. A committee considers the bill clause by clause, and reports the bill as amended to the House, where further detailed consideration ("consideration stage" or "report stage") occurs. However, a practice which used to be called the "kangaroo" (Standing Order 32) allows the Speaker to select which amendments are debated. This device is also used under Standing Order 89 by the committee chairman, to restrict debate in committee. The Speaker, who is impartial as between the parties, by convention selects amendments for debate which represent the main divisions of opinion within the House. Other amendments can technically be proposed, but in practice have no chance of success unless the parties in the House are closely divided. If pressed they would normally be casually defeated by acclamation.

Once the House has considered the bill, the third reading follows. In the House of Commons, no further amendments may be made, and the passage of the motion "That the Bill be now read a third time" is passage of the whole bill. In the House of Lords further amendments to the bill may be moved. After the passage of the third reading motion, the House of Lords must vote on the motion "That the Bill do now pass." Following its passage in one House, the bill is sent to the other House. If passed in identical form by both houses, it may be presented for the Sovereign's Assent. If one house passes amendments that the other will not agree to, and the two houses cannot resolve their disagreements, the bill will normally fail.

Since the passage of the Parliament Act 1911 the power of the House of Lords to reject bills passed by the House of Commons has been restricted, with further restrictions were placed by the Parliament Act 1949. If the House of Commons passes a public bill in two successive sessions, and the House of Lords rejects it both times, the Commons may direct that the bill be presented to the Sovereign for his or her Assent, disregarding the rejection of the Bill in the House of Lords. In each case, the bill must be passed by the House of Commons at least one calendar month before the end of the session. The provision does not apply to Private bills or to Public bills if they originated in the House of Lords or if they seek to extend the duration of a Parliament beyond five years. A special procedure applies in relation to bills classified by the Speaker of the House of Commons as "Money Bills". A Money Bill concerns solely national taxation or public funds; the Speaker's certificate is deemed conclusive under all circumstances. If the House of Lords fails to pass a Money Bill within one month of its passage in the House of Commons, the Lower House may direct that the Bill be submitted for the Sovereign's Assent immediately.

Even before the passage of the Parliament Acts, the Commons possessed pre-eminence in cases of financial matters. By ancient custom, the House of Lords may not introduce a bill relating to taxation or Supply, nor amend a bill so as to insert a provision relating to taxation or Supply, nor amend a Supply Bill in any way. The House of Commons is free to waive this privilege, and sometimes does so to allow the House of Lords to pass amendments with financial implications. The House of Lords remains free to reject bills relating to Supply and taxation, but may be over-ruled easily if the bills are Money Bills. (A bill relating to revenue and Supply may not be a Money Bill if, for example, it includes subjects other than national taxation and public funds).

The last stage of a bill involves the granting of royal assent. Theoretically, the Sovereign may either grant or withhold royal assent (make the bill a law or veto the bill). In modern times the Sovereign always grants royal assent, using the Norman French words "Le Roy le veult" (the King wishes it; "La Reyne" in the case of a Queen). The last refusal to grant the Assent was in 1708, when Queen Anne withheld her Assent from the Scottish Militia Bill, in the words "La reyne s'avisera" (the Queen will think it over).

Thus, every bill obtains the assent of all three components of Parliament before it becomes law (except where the House of Lords is over-ridden under the Parliament Acts 1911 and 1949). The words

"BE IT ENACTED by the King's most Excellent Majesty, by and with the advice and consent of the Lords Spiritual and Temporal, and Commons, in this present Parliament assembled, and by the authority of the same, as follows." or, where the House of Lords' authority has been over-ridden by use of the Parliament Acts, the words "BE IT ENACTED by King's most Excellent Majesty, by and with the advice and consent of the Commons in this present Parliament assembled, in accordance with the provisions of the Parliament Acts 1911 and 1949, and by the authority of the same, as follows..." appear near the beginning of each Act of Parliament. These words are known as the enacting formula.

== Judicial functions ==
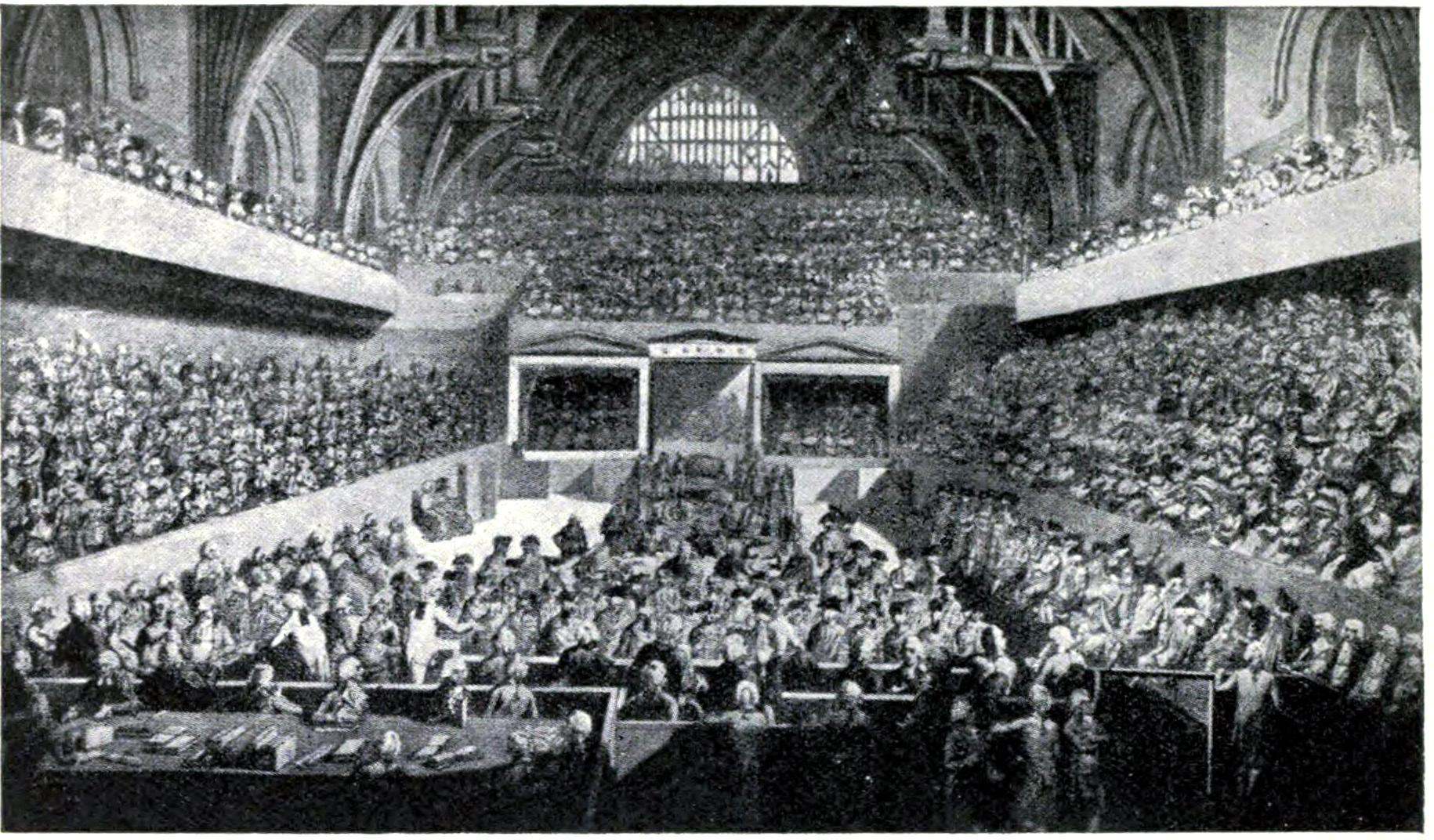
The impeachment of Warren Hastings, 1788

Prior to the creation of the Supreme Court of the United Kingdom in 2009, Parliament was the highest court in the realm for most purposes, but the Privy Council had jurisdiction in some cases (for instance, on devolved matters). The jurisdiction of Parliament arose from the ancient custom of petitioning the houses to redress grievances and to do justice. The House of Commons ceased considering petitions to reverse the judgements of lower courts in 1399, effectively leaving the House of Lords as the court of last resort. In modern times, the judicial functions of the House of Lords were performed not by the whole House, but by the Lords of Appeal in Ordinary (judges granted life peerage dignities under the Appellate Jurisdiction Act 1876) and by Lords of Appeal (other peers with experience in the judiciary). However, under the Constitutional Reform Act 2005, these judicial functions were transferred to the newly created Supreme Court in 2009, and the Lords of Appeal in Ordinary became the first Justices of the Supreme Court. Peers who hold high judicial office are no longer allowed to vote or speak in the Lords until they retire as justices.

In the late nineteenth century, acts allowed for the appointment of Scottish Lords of Appeal in Ordinary and ended appeal in Scottish criminal matters to the House of Lords, so that the High Court of Justiciary became the highest criminal court in Scotland. There is an argument that the provisions of Article XIX of the Union with England Act 1707 prevent any Court outside Scotland from hearing any appeal in criminal cases: "And that the said Courts or any other of the like nature after the Unions shall have no power to Cognosce Review or Alter the Acts or Sentences of the Judicatures within Scotland or stop the Execution of the same." The House of Lords judicial committee usually had a minimum of two Scottish Judges to ensure that some experience of Scots law was brought to bear on Scottish appeals in civil cases, from the Court of Session. The Supreme Court now usually has at least two Scottish judges, together with at least one from Northern Ireland. As Wales is developing its own judicature, it is likely that the same principle will be applied.

Certain other judicial functions have historically been performed by the House of Lords. Until 1948, it was the body in which peers had to be tried for felonies or high treason; now, they are tried by normal juries. The last occasion of the trial of a peer in the House of Lords was in 1935. When the House of Commons impeaches an individual, the trial takes place in the House of Lords. Impeachments are now possibly defunct, as the last one occurred in 1806. In 2000s, a number of MPs attempted to revive the custom, having signed a motion for the impeachment of Tony Blair, but this was unsuccessful.

== Relationship with the Government ==
The Prime Minister is the ultimate leader of HM Government, supported by Ministers, Junior Ministers, and members of the governments civil service. The government runs the country, whilst being answerable to Parliament, who must ensure the government is working in the public's interest.

The Prime Minister and most members of the Cabinet are, by convention, members of the House of Commons. The last Prime Minister to be a member of the House of Lords was Alec Douglas-Home, 14th Earl of Home, who became Prime Minister in 1963. To adhere to the convention under which he was responsible to the Lower House, he disclaimed his peerage and procured election to the House of Commons within days of becoming Prime Minister.

Governments have a tendency to dominate the legislative functions of Parliament, by using their in-built majority in the House of Commons, and sometimes using their patronage power to appoint supportive peers in the Lords. In practice, governments can pass any legislation (within reason) in the Commons they wish, unless there is major dissent by MPs in the governing party, an example being the Shops Bill 1986. In 1976, Quintin Hogg, Lord Hailsham of St Marylebone popularised a now widely used name for this behaviour, called "elective dictatorship".

Parliament controls the executive by passing or rejecting its Bills and by forcing Ministers of the Crown to answer for their actions, either at "Question Time" or during meetings of the parliamentary committees. In both cases, Ministers are asked questions by members of their houses, and are obliged to answer.

Although the House of Lords may scrutinise the executive, it cannot bring down the Government and is focused on challenging them, and revising legislation. A ministry must always retain the confidence and support of the House of Commons. The Lower House may indicate its lack of support by rejecting a Motion of Confidence or by passing a Motion of No Confidence. Confidence Motions are generally originated by the Government to reinforce its support in the House, whilst No Confidence Motions are introduced by the Opposition.

Many votes are considered votes of confidence. Important bills that form part of the Government's agenda (as stated in the Speech from the Throne) are generally considered matters of confidence. The defeat of such a bill by the House of Commons indicates that a Government no longer has the confidence of that House. The same effect is achieved if the House of Commons "withdraws Supply", that is, rejects the budget, which is why coalition governments must make confidence and supply agreements. Where a Government has lost the confidence of the House of Commons, in other words has lost the ability to secure the basic requirement of the authority of the House of Commons to tax and to spend Government money, the Prime Minister is obliged either to resign, or seek the dissolution of Parliament and a new general election.

Where a prime minister has ceased to retain the necessary majority and requests a dissolution, the sovereign can in theory reject his or her request, forcing a resignation and allowing the Leader of the Opposition to be asked to form a new government. This power is used extremely rarely. The conditions that should be met to allow such a refusal are known as the Lascelles Principles. These conditions and principles are constitutional conventions arising from the Sovereign's reserve powers as well as longstanding tradition and practice, not laid down in law.

In practice, the House of Commons' scrutiny of the Government is very weak. Since the first-past-the-post electoral system is employed in elections, the governing party tends to enjoy a large majority in the Commons; there is often limited need to compromise with other parties. Modern British political parties are so tightly organised that they leave relatively little room for free action by their MPs. In many cases, MPs may be expelled from their parties for voting against the instructions of party leaders. During the 20th century, the Government has lost confidence issues only three times—twice in 1924, and once in 1979.

=== Parliamentary questions ===
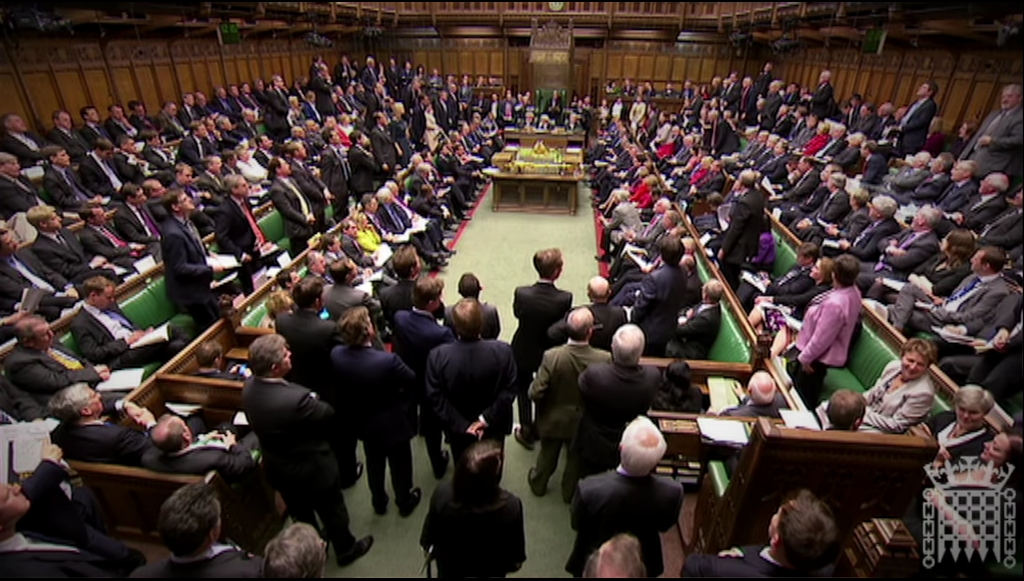
A wide shot of Prime Ministers Questions in 2012, showing the House of Commons packed with members

In the United Kingdom, question time in the House of Commons lasts for an hour each day from Monday to Thursday (2:30 to 3:30 pm on Mondays, 11:30 am to 12:30 pm on Tuesdays and Wednesdays, and 9:30 to 10:30 am on Thursdays). Each Government department has its place in a rota which repeats every five weeks. The exception to this sequence are the Business Questions (Questions to the Leader of House of Commons), in which questions are answered each Thursday about the business of the House the following week. Also, Questions to the Prime Minister takes place each Wednesday from noon to 12:30 pm.

In addition to government departments, there are also questions to the Church commissioners. Additionally, each Member of Parliament is entitled to table questions for written answer. Written questions are addressed to the Ministerial head of a government department, usually a Secretary of State, but they are often answered by a Minister of State or Parliamentary Under Secretary of State. Written Questions are submitted to the Clerks of the Table Office, either on paper or electronically, and answers are recorded in The Official Report (Hansard) so as to be widely available and accessible.

In the House of Lords, a half-hour is set aside each afternoon at the start of the day's proceedings for Lords' oral questions. A peer submits a question in advance, which then appears on the Order Paper for the day's proceedings. The peer shall say: "My Lords, I beg leave to ask the Question standing in my name on the Order Paper." The Minister responsible then answers the question. The peer is then allowed to ask a supplementary question and other peers ask further questions on the theme of the original put down on the order paper. (For instance, if the question regards immigration, peers can ask the Minister any question related to immigration during the allowed period.)

== Parliamentary sovereignty ==
Several different views have been taken of Parliament's sovereignty. According to the jurist Sir William Blackstone, "It has sovereign and uncontrollable authority in making, confirming, enlarging, restraining, abrogating, repealing, reviving, and expounding of laws, concerning matters of all possible denominations, ecclesiastical, or temporal, civil, military, maritime, or criminal... it can, in short, do every thing that is not naturally impossible."

A different view has been taken by the Scottish judge Thomas Cooper, 1st Lord Cooper of Culross. When he decided the 1953 case of MacCormick v. Lord Advocate as Lord President of the Court of Session, he stated, "The principle of unlimited sovereignty of Parliament is a distinctively English principle and has no counterpart in Scottish constitutional law." He continued, "Considering that the Union legislation extinguished the Parliaments of Scotland and England and replaced them by a new Parliament, I have difficulty in seeing why the new Parliament of Great Britain must inherit all the peculiar characteristics of the English Parliament but none of the Scottish." Acts passed in 1921 and 1925 granted the Church of Scotland complete independence in ecclesiastical matters.

From 1973 to 2020, under membership of the European Community and European Union, parliament agreed to the position that European law would apply and be enforceable in Britain and that Britain would be subject to the rulings of the European Court of Justice. In the Factortame case, the European Court of Justice ruled that British courts could have powers to overturn British legislation that was not compatible with European law. This position ended with the passing of the European Union (Withdrawal Agreement) Act 2020 and Britain leaving the EU on 31 January 2020. The European Union (Withdrawal Agreement) Act 2020 states "It is recognised that the Parliament of the United Kingdom is sovereign".

== Privileges ==
The concept of parliamentary privilege is that certain immunities are needed to allow Parliament to function effectively. The foremost privilege claimed by both houses is that of freedom of speech in debate; nothing said in either House may result in members being found in contempt of court, unless it is not within the remit of parliamentary privilege. Despite this, there are some limitations, such as not discussing current court cases, which could have the potential to prejudice proceedings. Freedom of speech was established legally originally within article 9 of the Bill of Rights 1689. Parliamentary privilege has been used to name people who successfully obtained injunctions to remain anonymous, including in regards to legal proceedings, although rules advise against such disclosures.

Another privilege example is that of freedom from arrest; this is specific to civil arrest and detention and excludes arrest and detention in regards to criminal law and applies during the session of Parliament, and 40 days before or after. Other exceptions exist, such as detention that may be necessary as a result of the Mental Health Act 1983. Members of both houses are no longer privileged from service on juries.

== Emblem ==
Beaufort Portcullis badge of the Tudors

The badge of Parliament is a crowned portcullis, and was officially granted by the Queen in 1996. The portcullis was originally the badge of various English noble families from the 14th century. It went on to be adopted by the kings of the Tudor dynasty in the 16th century, under whom the Palace of Westminster became the regular meeting place of Parliament. The crown was added to make the badge a specifically royal symbol.

The portcullis probably first came to be associated with the Palace of Westminster through its use as decoration in the rebuilding of the Palace after the fire of 1512. The widespread use of the portcullis throughout the Palace dates from the 19th century, when Charles Barry used it extensively as a decorative feature in the designs for the new Palace built following the disastrous 1834 fire.

The crowned portcullis came to be accepted during the early 20th century as the emblem of both houses of parliament. This was simply a result of custom and usage rather than a specific decision. The emblem now appears on all official stationery, publications and papers, and is stamped on various items in use in the Palace of Westminster, such as cutlery, silverware and china.

== The Parliamentary Press Gallery ==
In May 1803, the Commons Speaker Abbot ruled that part of the Public Gallery would be reserved in future for the Press. In the 1870s, a list was drawn up of parliamentary reporters who were permitted in the Members' Lobby. The press gallery in the House of Commons was significantly expanded in 1881.

== Broadcast media ==
All public events are broadcast live and on-demand via parliamentlive.tv, which maintains an archive dating back to 4 December 2007. There is also a related official YouTube channel. They are also broadcast live by the independent Euronews English channel. In the UK, the BBC has its own dedicated parliament channel, BBC Parliament, which broadcasts 24 hours a day and is also available on BBC iPlayer. It shows live coverage from the House of Commons, House of Lords, the Scottish Parliament, the Northern Ireland Assembly and the Senedd.

== See also ==
- Act of Parliament
- Acts of Parliament of the United Kingdom relating to the European Communities and the European Union
- History of democracy
- The History of Parliament
- List of acts of the Parliament of the United Kingdom
- List of British governments
- List of legislatures in the United Kingdom
- List of parliaments of the United Kingdom
- Parliament in the Making, a programme of anniversary events in 2015
- Parliamentary agent
- Parliamentary Brief
- Parliamentary Information and Communication Technology Service
- Parliamentary Information Management System
- Parliamentary Office of Science and Technology
- Parliamentary records of the United Kingdom
- Proposed relocation of the Parliament of the United Kingdom
- Records of members of parliament of the United Kingdom
- TheyWorkForYou
- Constituencies of the Parliament of the United Kingdom
- UK Parliament Week

=== Lists of MPs elected ===
- List of MPs elected in the 1966 United Kingdom general election
- List of MPs elected in the 1970 United Kingdom general election
- List of MPs elected in the February 1974 United Kingdom general election
- List of MPs elected in the October 1974 United Kingdom general election
- List of MPs elected in the 1979 United Kingdom general election
- List of MPs elected in the 1983 United Kingdom general election
- List of MPs elected in the 1987 United Kingdom general election
- List of MPs elected in the 1992 United Kingdom general election
- List of MPs elected in the 1997 United Kingdom general election
- List of MPs elected in the 2001 United Kingdom general election
- List of MPs elected in the 2005 United Kingdom general election
- List of MPs elected in the 2010 United Kingdom general election
- List of MPs elected in the 2015 United Kingdom general election
- List of MPs elected in the 2017 United Kingdom general election
- List of MPs elected in the 2019 United Kingdom general election
- List of MPs elected in the 2024 United Kingdom general election

== Sources ==
- Eds. Britannica (1911). "Black Rod" . In Chisholm, Hugh (ed.). Encyclopædia Britannica. Vol. 4 (11th ed.). Cambridge University Press.
- Davies, Godfrey (1959). The Early Stuarts 1603–1660. The Oxford History of England (2nd ed.). Oxford, England: Oxford University Press. ISBN 0198217048.
- Jones, Christopher (1983). The Great Palace: The Story of Parliament. London, England: British Broadcasting Corporation. ISBN 9780563201786.
- May, Erskine; Chisholm, Hugh (1911). "Parliament" . In Chisholm, Hugh (ed.). Encyclopædia Britannica. Vol. 20 (11th ed.). Cambridge University Press.
- Port, M. H., ed. (1976). The Houses of Parliament. New Haven, Connecticut, London, England: Yale University Press. ISBN 9780300020229.
- Wedgwood, C. V. (1958). The Great Rebellion. Vol. 2: The King's War 1641–1647 (2nd ed.). Glasgow, Scotland: William Collins, Sons.
- Woolrych, Austin (2002). Britain in Revolution. Oxford, England: Oxford University Press. ISBN 0199272689.
