= Periphyton =

Bioindicators attached to submerged surfaces in most aquatic ecosystems

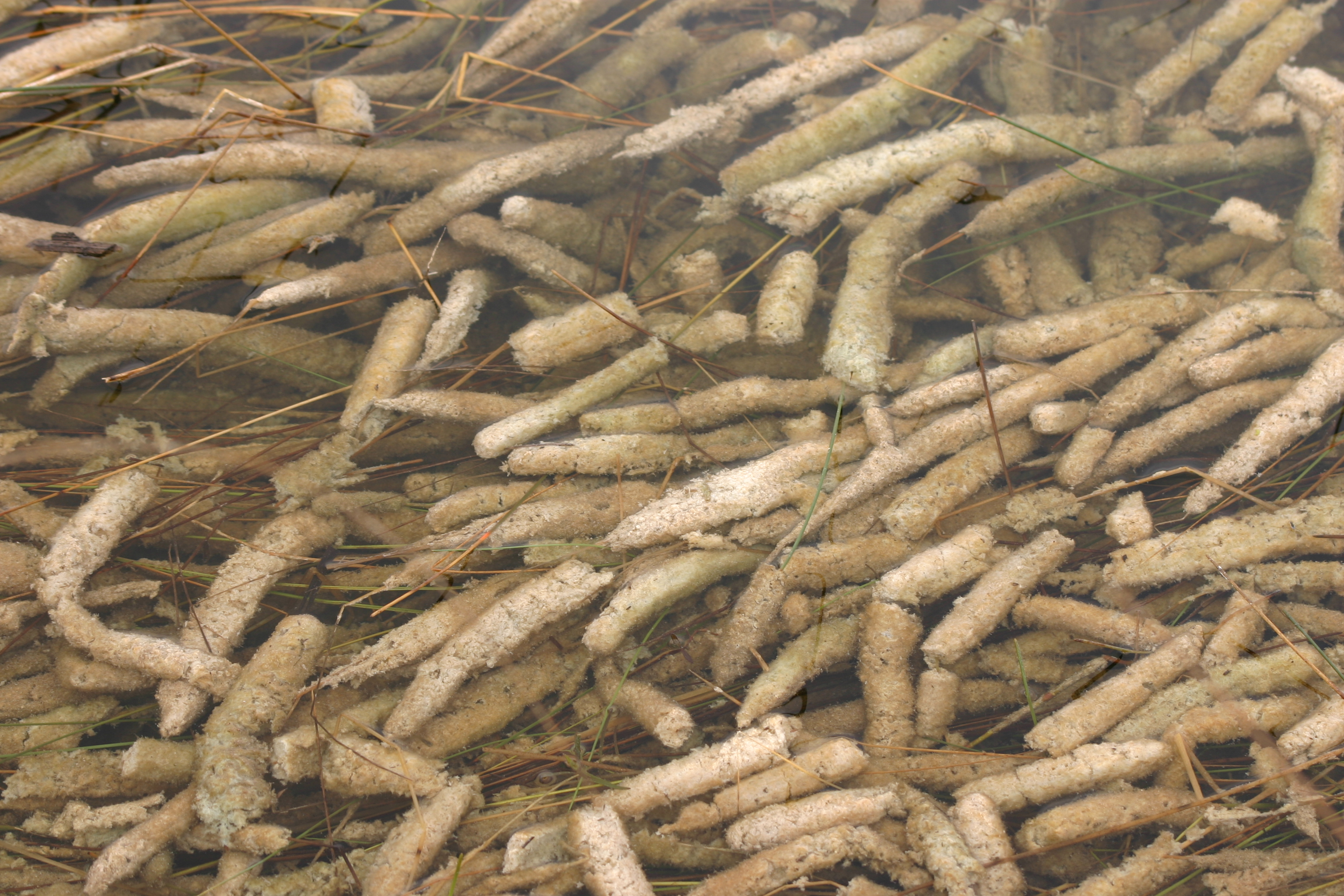
Periphyton in the Everglades

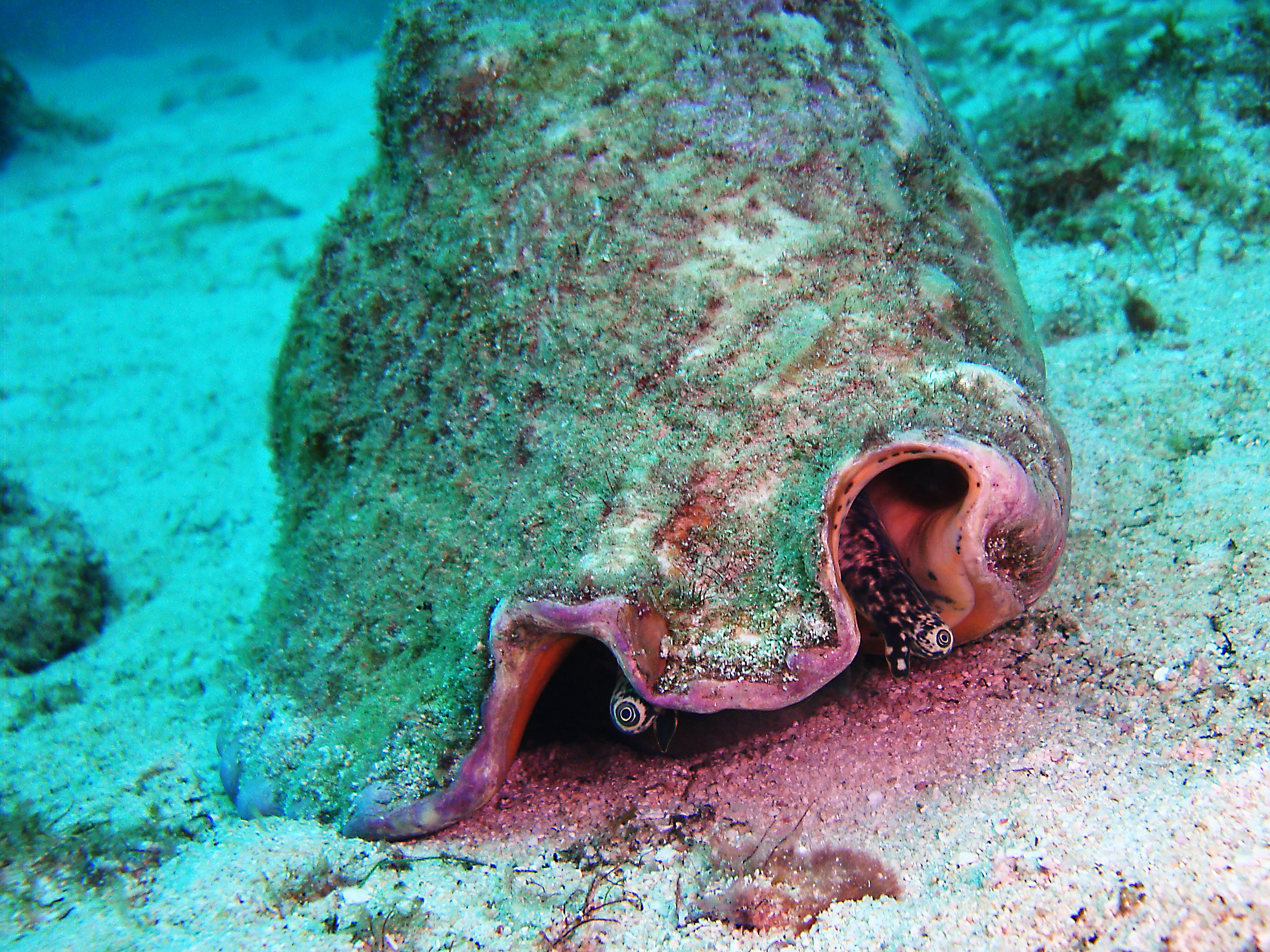
The shell of Eustrombus gigas in its natural habitat is covered by periphyton.

Periphyton is a complex mixture of algae, cyanobacteria, heterotrophic microbes, and detritus that is attached to submerged surfaces in most aquatic ecosystems. The related term aufwuchs (German 'surface growth' or 'overgrowth', pronounced [ˈaʊ̯fˌvuːks]) refers to the collection of small animals and plants that adhere to open surfaces in aquatic environments, such as parts of rooted plants.

Periphyton serves as an important food source for invertebrates, tadpoles, and some fishes. It can also absorb contaminants, removing them from the water column and limiting their movement through the environment. The periphyton is also an important indicator of water quality; responses of this community to pollutants can be measured at a variety of scales representing physiological to community-level changes. Periphyton has often been used as an experimental system in, e.g., pollution-induced community tolerance studies.

== Composition ==
In both marine and freshwater environments, algae – particularly green algae and diatoms – make up the dominant component of surface growth communities. Small crustaceans, rotifers, and protozoans are also commonly found in fresh water and the sea, but insect larvae, oligochaetes and tardigrades are endemic to freshwater periphyton.

== Growth ==
Periphyton can contain species of cyanobacteria that are toxic to humans and other animals. In fresh water, excessive growth and subsequent death and decay of periphyton can have undesirable effects: depleting oxygen in the water, altering its pH, and clogging the space between gravel and sand (the hyporheic zone). These effects, known collectively as eutrophication, can impair or kill fishes and other animals, reduce the quality of drinking water, and make waterways unappealing for recreation. Remediating the damage to biodiversity and ecosystems caused by excessive periphyton growth costs billions of dollars annually.

Conversely, periphyton is endangered by urbanization: the increased turbidity levels associated with urban sprawl can smother periphyton, causing it to detach from the rocks on which it lives.

== Uses ==
Periphyton communities are used in aquaculture food production systems for the removal of solid and dissolved pollutants. Their performance in filtration is established and their application as aquacultural feed is being researched. It can be important for the clearance of harmful chemicals and reducing turbidity.

== Water quality ==
Periphyton serves as an indicator of water quality because:

- It has a naturally high number of species.
- It has a fast response to changes.
- It is easy to sample.
- It is known for tolerance/sensitivity to change.

== Food source ==
Many aquatic animals feed extensively on periphyton. The mbuna cichlids from Lake Malawi are particularly well known examples of fish adapted for feeding on periphyton. Examples include Labeotropheus trewavasae and Pseudotropheus zebra. They have scraper-like teeth that allow them to rasp the periphyton from rocks. In marine communities, periphyton food sources are important for animals such as limpets and sea urchins. Another amphibian that feeds on periphyton are spring peepers, small chorus frogs that occupy many ponds throughout Canada and the eastern United States. Spring peepers filter periphyton from the environmental surfaces of their habitat.

== See also ==
- Biofilm – Film of microorganisms on a surface
