= Pollution-induced community tolerance =

Pollution-induced community tolerance (PICT) is an approach to measuring the response of pollution-induced selective pressures on a community. It is an eco-toxicological tool that approaches community tolerance to pollution from a holistic standpoint. Community Tolerance can increase in one of three ways: physical adaptations or phenotypic plasticity, selection of favorable genotypes, and the replacement of sensitive species by tolerant species in a community.

PICT differs from the population tolerance approach to community tolerance in that it can be easily applied to any ecosystem and it is not critical to use a representative test organism, as with the population tolerance approach.

== Community tolerance ==
Community tolerance can be used as an indicator for determining if a toxicant has a disturbance on an exposed community for multiple types of organisms. Tolerance of a toxicant can increase in three ways: physiological adaptation, also known as the phenotypic plasticity of an individual; tolerant genotypes selected within a population over time; and the replacement of species with more tolerant ones within a community. Physiological adaptation, or phenotypic plasticity, is the ability of an individual organism to change its phenotype in response to changes in the environment. This can occur with huge variance between the type of organism and the type of the disturbance they experience. Natural selection that occurs over several generations causes an entire population to exhibit specific selection of genotypes. Over time, tolerant genotypes can be selected over non-tolerant ones and can cause a shift in a population's genome. Natural selection can also cause a replacement of less tolerant species with more tolerant species. All of these aspects can alter a community's structure drastically, and if a toxicant can be identified as the culprit, action can take place to prevent the accumulation and environmental impacts of that toxicant. PICT can be used for linkage between cause (exposure) and effect of the toxicants due to the structure of a community that has survived the event, also known as toxicant-induced succession (TIS). Toxicant-induced succession would be the development of more tolerant generations once a chemical was introduced into the environment. This is why the PICT method is most often applied to communities with short generation times such as microbial and algal communities, whereas there are rare works that use the PICT tool on organisms other than microorganisms.

There are two types of tolerances that can occur: multiple and co-tolerance. Multiple tolerances can elevate an individual's ability to tolerate several toxicants present at once. This means that the type of chemicals present in the environment, the concentration, and the organisms that are affected could alter the environment in multiple different ways. Co-tolerance is the ability of an organism to develop a tolerance to a certain toxicant in short-term tests, and obtain that tolerance for other toxicants similar to the first. Furthermore, co-tolerance depends on the interaction of different factors, such as the toxicant to which communities have been chronically exposed, the mode(s) of action of the different toxicants, but also the detoxification mechanisms implemented by the organisms, and the targeted biological community (e.g., heterotrophs, heterotrophs) It can be difficult to determine which type of tolerance is occurring if there are multiple types of toxicants in a community because they could be acting simultaneously. Basically it is difficult to understand what exactly may be going on in a community without testing it with multiple ecotoxicological tools with long- and short-term toxicity tests. However, in the context of biomonitoring with the PICT method, co-tolerance could be an advantage, as it would allow working step by step. A first step would then be to use a model toxicant from a class of pollutants (selected on the basis of their co-tolerance properties) in order to limit the number of suspect pollutants in the ecotoxicological assessment of an environment For example, a PICT study on soil in microcosms amended with organic manure observed co-tolerance only between antibiotics of the same group (oxytetracycline and tetracycline), as expected from their identical mode of action. This type of approach is still preliminary, there is a need for further in situ studies combining PICT with chemical monitoring of environments, experimental work under controlled laboratory conditions, and integration of PICT into modeling approaches to precise these patterns of co-tolerance. A complementary approach derived from Pesce et al. (2011) and Foulquier et al. (2015) was recently applied by Tlili et al. (2020), combining passive sampling systems with PICT bioassays on river biofilms collected upstream and downstream of wastewater treatment plants at two-year intervals (before and after a change in effluent treatment). Their results demonstrate the value of combining the PICT approach with the use of passive sampler extracts to establish causality between in situ exposure to complex mixtures of micropollutants and ecotoxic effects on autotrophic and heterotrophic microbial communities.

== Field studies ==
Assessing pollution-induced community tolerance can be done utilizing in situ techniques, many of which involve the use of known or created chemical exposure gradients. One example is the use of a known concentration gradient of Tri-n-butylin to assess PICT in periphyton. Tolerance patterns showed that tolerance was highest closest to the marina that was the source of contamination. The use of reference sites in addition to contaminated sites is also commonly used for translocation assessments of PICT. A study in Germany cultured periphyton on glass discs in two river systems north of Leipzig, Germany. One system was the contaminated area of study and the other was 10 km upstream and uncontaminated, intended to be used as a reference. After the colonization period, 6 of the 10 racks of glass discs were trans-located to the other river system. During the experiment the community structure present on the glass discs from the reference site, when translocated to the contaminated site changed to mirror that of the control discs that were left in the contaminated sites. Note the interest of using long-term observation sites to address the consequences of contamination and restoration of environments with PICT. One example is the Ardières-Morcille river hydrology observatory in the Beaujolais (vineyard region, France) where numerous in situ PICT studies have been conducted, and which has also been used for many PICT experiments in the laboratory (see for example). Of particular note at this site is the study conducted by Pesce et al. (2016) during three consecutive years (2009–2011): The authors monitored the decrease in tolerance of periphyton to diuron (herbicide applied in vineyards and banned since 2008) downstream of the river crossing this wine-growing watershed. Their results showed a direct link between the evolution of an agricultural practice (here the banning of diuron) and ecological changes in the river (through the loss of tolerance measured by the PICT). Lake Geneva is one of the subalpine lakes studied for a long time by the International Commission for the Protection of Lake Geneva (CIPEL). A PICT study carried out 12 years apart showed the restoration of the lake's phytoplankton with a concomitant decrease in the tolerance of the communities towards atrazine and copper and in the concentrations of these two contaminants (following legislation limiting the use of atrazine in agriculture and framing the management of industrial waste). In another study in Denmark, enclosure experiments were done allowing for an assessment of PICT utilizing the lake water from Lake Bure as a baseline. By using this water from the lake potentially confounding variables would be nullified by comparing results to the control. Concentrations of atrazine and copper were added to these enclosures in varying concentrations. As in other experiments previously discussed periphyton communities were used in this experiment and were cultured using glass discs. Photosynthetic activity was measured and used as a measurement of PICT throughout the experiment. The experiment showed that elevated levels of Cu lead to community tolerance of the phytoplankton community as well as co-tolerance of zinc. Total Biomass decreased at the outset of the trials involving high concentrations of Cu indicating that Community Tolerance was increased due to direct mortality of the sensitive species. The in situ study of Bérard & Benninghoff, (2001) in enclosures repeated over several years in the lake of Geneva, showed that the tolerance of phytoplankton to the herbicide atrazine (photosynthesis inhibitor) varied according to the seasons during which the experiment was carried out. These changes in tolerance for the same toxicant and at the same concentration (10 μg/L) were probably linked to the initial compositions of the algal and cyanobacterial communities and to environmental factors associated with seasonal parameters (temperature, light, nutrients, etc.). PICT studies on large spatial scales are rare and difficult to conduct, note this European study by Blanck et al. (2003) on zinc tolerance in river periphyton.

The use of PICT in an in situ fashion is not limited to aquatic systems. Studies on soil microbial communities have been conducted in industrial and agricultural contexts (see the review of Boivin et al., 2002). Thus, for examples in the context of industrial contamination a study involving 2,4,6-Trinitrotoluene utilized respirometric techniques to measure Pollution-Induced Community Tolerance in soil microbial communities in response to the presence of TNT. The results of this study further corroborate the PICT Theory, in that treatments with long-term exposure to TNT had a larger proportion of TNT-resistant bacteria than soils with low levels of TNT. This PICT caused by TNT was also present in another study. Microrespirometry measurements carried out on soil samples taken along three transects have highlighted the tolerance to Pb in a site bordering a lead smelter with long-term polymetallic contamination dominated by Pb. The PICT established causal relationships between Pb and its effect on microbial communities by considering the history of environmental contamination at the community level. Furthermore, a positive correlation between community metabolic quotient and PICT suggested that the acquisition of Pb stress-induced tolerance would have resulted in a higher energetic cost for microbial communities to cope with metal toxicity. Other studies have highlighted in various contexts, this cost of contaminant-induced tolerance. In the context of agricultural contamination, Bérard et al. (2004) validated the PICT tool (by measuring photosynthetic activity) for atrazine tolerance on edaphic microalgae, comparing soils of conventionally and organically farmed corn fields. Changes in taxonomic structure of diatom communities sampled from soils under both types of farming practices, as well as nanocosm experiments, confirmed the selective effect of atrazine. In terrestrial environment, the PICT method is widely applied to metal contamination and since 2010, to antibiotic tolerance in interaction with metal contamination.

Ideally, pollution-induced community tolerance can be assessed in the field by using a representative sample of the natural community in response to environmental contamination. However, this is not always the case, which is why laboratory studies are necessary supplements to properly assess PICT.

== Experimental studies ==
Experimental investigation of PICT is performed to eliminate factors other than pollution that may affect community structure and ecophysiology, or on the contrary to study them (by controlling them). Much work has been done in controlled systems (see reviews by Blanck, 2002 and Tlili et al. 2016). They can be conducted in conjunction with field work, as in the study by Blanck and Dahl (1996). In this study, the results from laboratory acute toxicity tests of TBT on periphyton corroborated the results from the field study, supporting the conclusion that toxicity to periphyton resulted from TBT pollution at the site under investigation. The results from acute toxicity tests can thus help determine whether the effect identified is due to a specific contaminant. Bérard et al. (2003) used experimental systems of increasing complexity associated with monitoring of sites in Lake Geneva more or less contaminated by Irgarol (antifouling inhibitor of photosynthesis), and crossed the results of ecotoxicity of strains isolated from these sites and from non-contaminated control sites with experiments in nanocosms and PICT measurements. This work highlighted the high toxicity of Irgarol (compared to atrazine having the same site of action, and presenting a co-tolerance) on periphyton and phytoplankton and its potential for selection pressure at existing concentrations in the lake.

== The PICT methodology ==
There are a variety of methods for laboratory testing PICT, but a general format includes sampling, a bioassay, and an analysis of community structure.

Samples can be collected on artificial or natural substrata, either in situ or in the laboratory. There must be a series of samples exposed to different concentrations of contaminant and a control sample. In situ sampling involves setting up a sampling device in an aquatic ecosystem and allowing it to colonize for some time (e.g. a couple of weeks). One example is the diatometer, a device that is deployed in the water that becomes colonized by diatoms, and then is removed for analysis. In situ sampling devices are set up at increasing distances from the pollution source in the case of point source pollution. The samples thus represent a gradient in contaminant concentration, assuming that the contaminant becomes more dilute with increasing distance from the point source. An example of laboratory sampling was used in a study by Schmitt-Jansen and Altenburger (2005). For 14 days communities were allowed to establish on discs set up in laboratory aquariums which were continuously mixed and inoculated with algae from a pond. The aquariums were dosed with different concentrations of herbicide to get a gradient of long-term (14-day) contaminant exposures. Once a week the aquarium water was completely replaced and re-dosed with herbicide. Terrestrial studies pose other difficulties because it is difficult to use colonization systems by the communities investigated. Generally one samples the soil with its intrinsic heterogeneity and components other than microorganisms (minerals, organics ..), which increases measurement difficulties and biases related to contaminant bioavailability.

A bioassay is conducted on the samples to test for correlation between tolerance and long-term contaminant exposure. First, samples are exposed to different concentrations of contaminant. Then an endpoint is measured to determine the toxic effect on the sample organisms. The results from these measurements are used to produce a dose-response curve and an EC50. Both Blanck (1996) and Schmitt-Jansen and Altenburger (2005) photosynthesis as their endpoint. Since the work of Blanck et al. (1988), other endpoints have been tested such as: induced fluorescence, PAM fluorimetry, leucine incorporation and eco-plates, microbial respiration, enzyme activities, potential ammonium oxidation assay... In order to use the PICT method in biomonitoring and environmental risk assessment, it is necessary to advance in the standardization of these bioassays, both for the sampling of the tested communities, but also for the bioassays themselves.

Community structure of the samples is analyzed to check for a correlation between species prevalence and long-term contaminant exposure. Samples are taxonomically classified to determine the composition and species diversity of the communities that established over the long term exposures. The results are compared to the concentration of contaminant in the long-term exposure to conclude if a relationship was found in the study. Recent developments in microbial ecology using molecular biology and "omics" methods, chemotaxonomy methods, functional diversity measurements, biological trait and biological interaction network approaches, are varied, complementary and promising ecological tools to address PICT selection pressure.
