= Parliamentary Information and Communication Technology Service =

Parliamentary Information and Communication Technology Service or PICT provides IT services to MPs, Peers and staff across the UK Parliament. It is the only department of Parliament jointly owned by both Houses.
