= Sociable (disambiguation) =

Sociable may refer to:

- Social behavior
- Sociable, a two seated bicycle
- Sociable number, a type of number
- Sociable lapwing, a bird
- Sociable (carriage), a type of carriage
- Sociable weaver, a bird
- Scott Sociable, a 1920s automobile
- Sopwith Sociable, a 1914 biplane
