= Clarence (carriage) =

Type of horse-drawn carriage

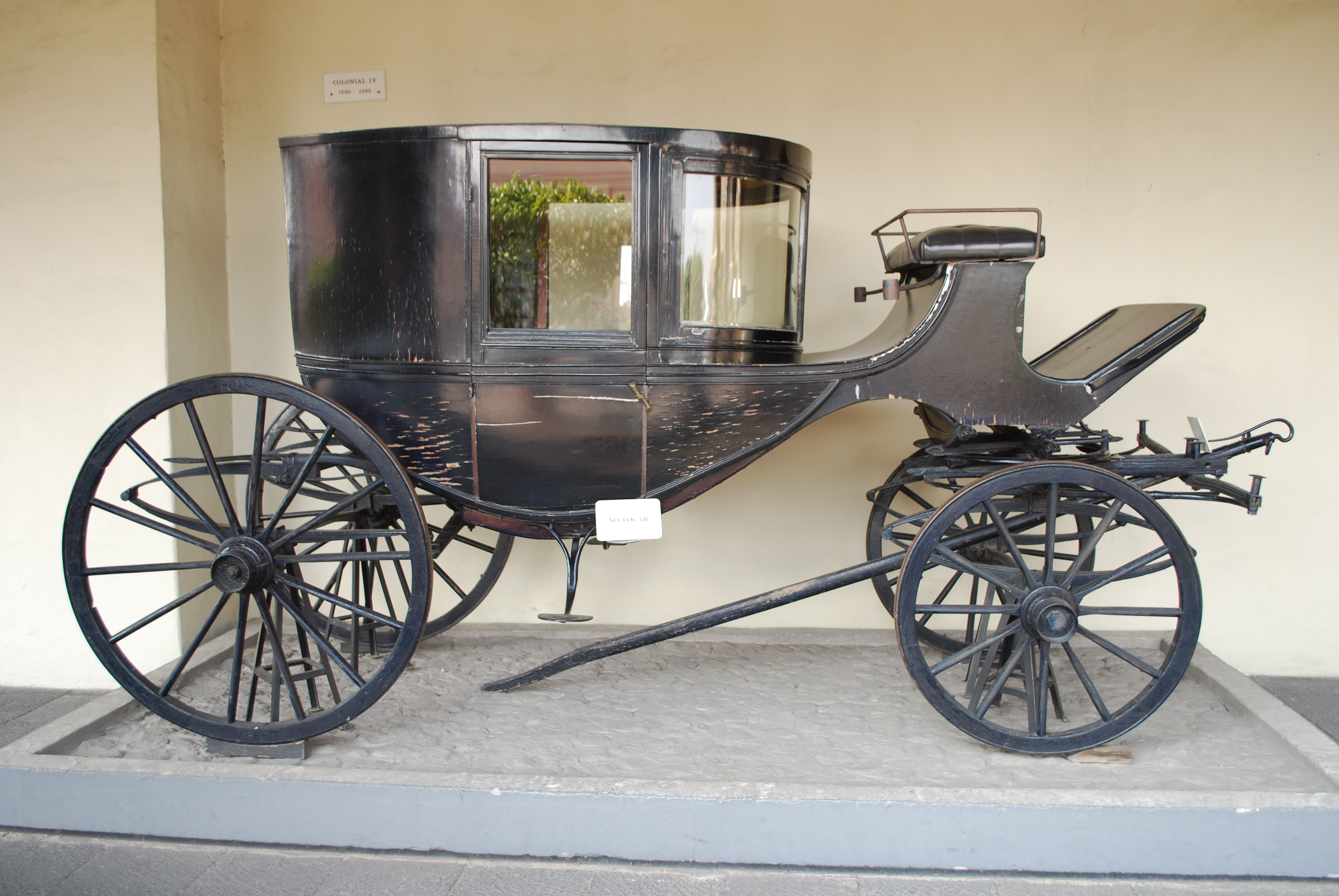
Clarence carriage on display at Palace of Cortés in Mexico

A clarence is a type of carriage that was popular in the early 19th century. It is a closed, four-wheeled horse-drawn vehicle with a projecting glass front and seats for four passengers inside. The driver sat at the front, outside the carriage. The clarence was named after Prince William, Duke of Clarence and St Andrews, later King William IV of the United Kingdom, who died in 1837. It was introduced in 1840 in London. The Brougham was a lighter, two-passenger version originally commissioned by Lord Brougham.

In time, second-hand clarences came to be used as hackney carriages, earning the nickname growler from the sound they made on London's cobbled streets.

== Gallery ==
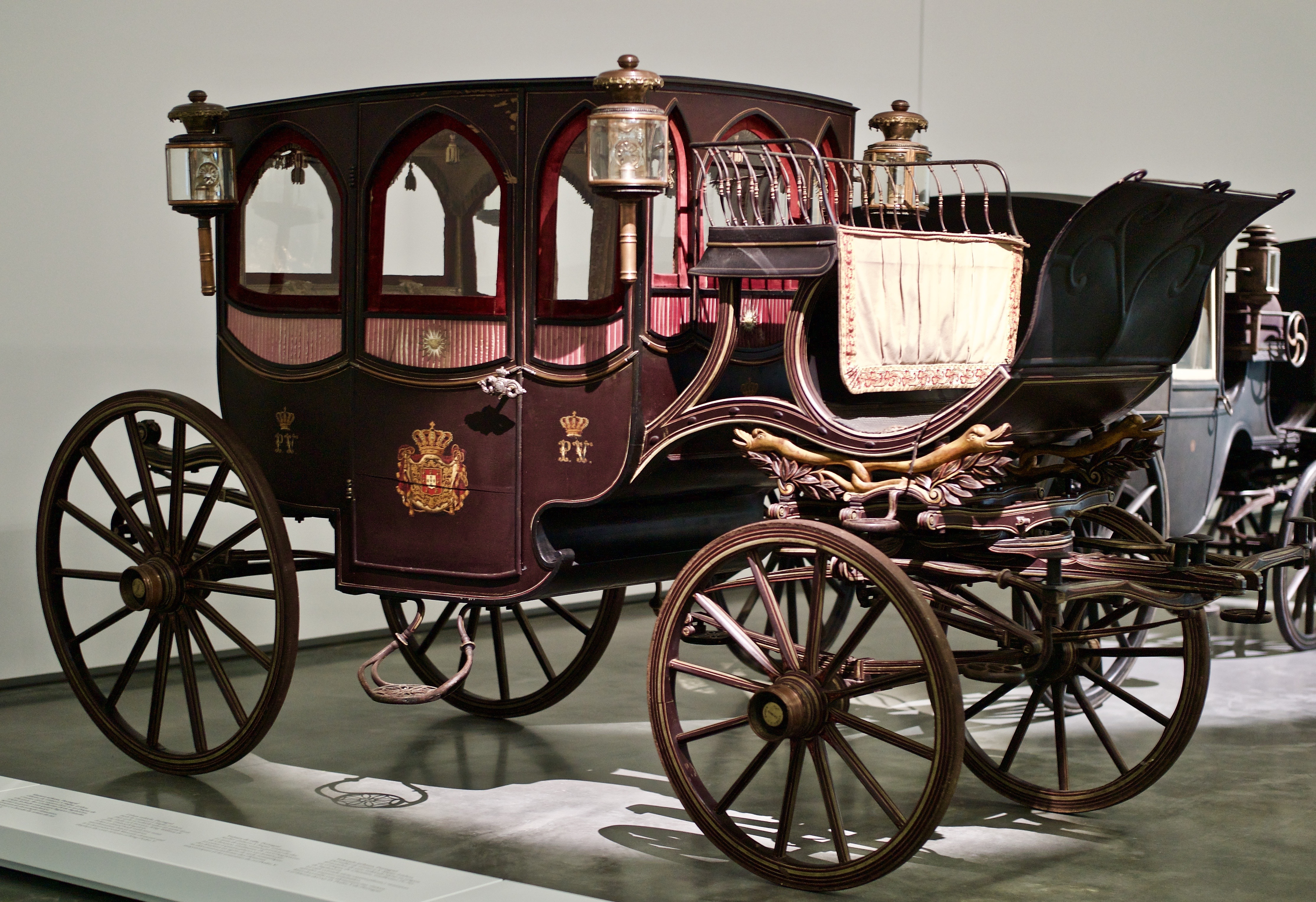
King Pedro V's Clarence coach at National Coach Museum, Portugal

A Portuguese Clarence by Binder of Paris

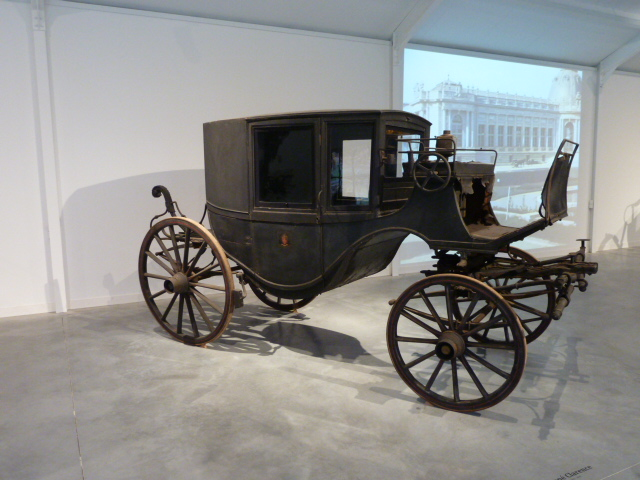
A Clarence at Karrenmuseum in Belgium

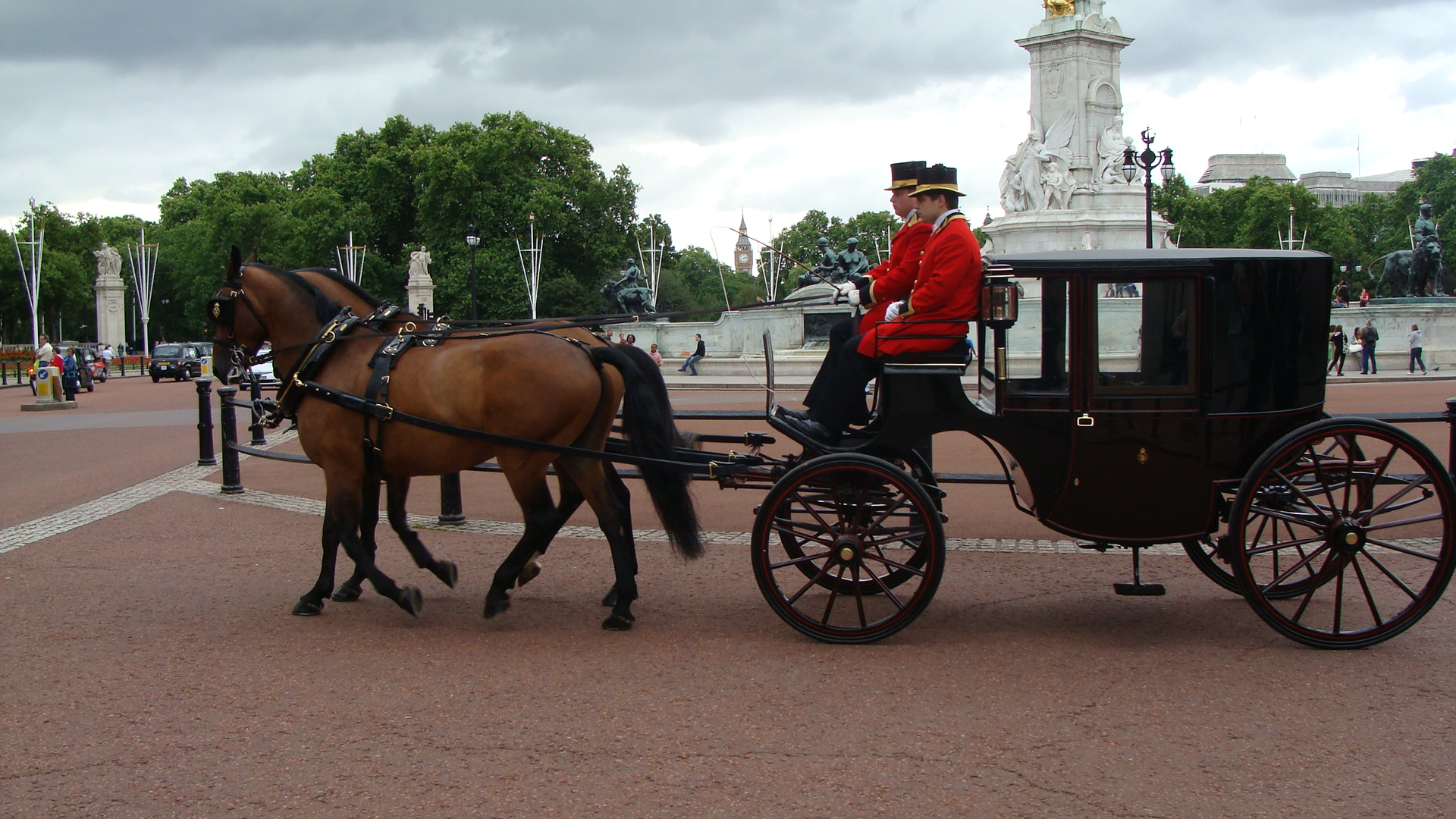
A Clarence from the Royal Mews in London
