= Windsor Grey =

Horses used by the British Royal household

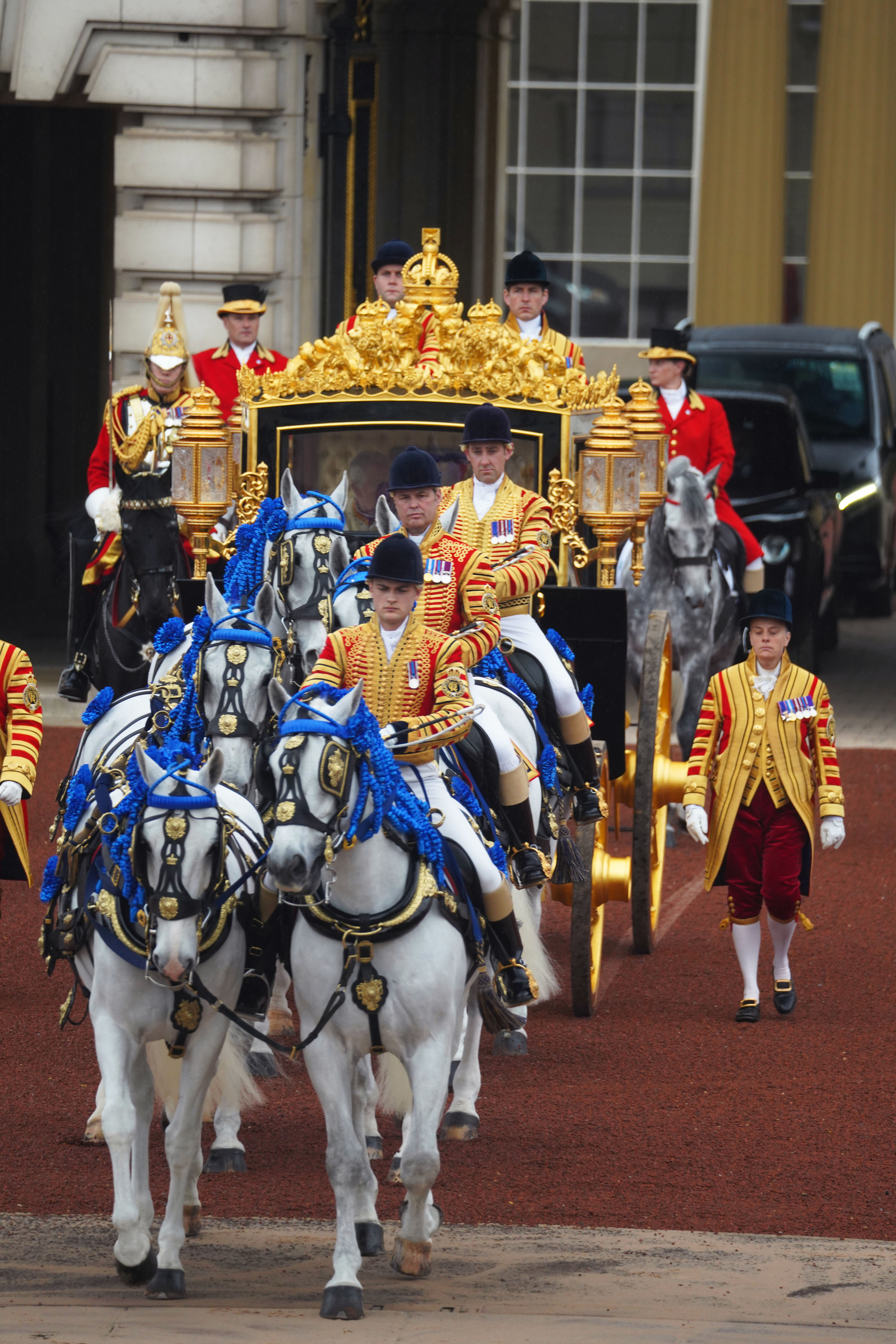
6 Windsor Greys pull the Diamond Jubilee State Coach

Windsor Grey is a moniker for the grey horses used by the British monarchy to pull carriages and state coaches in ceremonial processions such as those for coronations, royal weddings, Trooping the Colour, and the opening of Parliament. They are named for Windsor Castle where they were originally stabled, though today they live at the Royal Mews near Buckingham Palace.

Windsor Greys and Cleveland Bays make up the majority of the royal carriage horses. The Greys are not a breed, but are of warmblood type of at least 16.1 hands (65 inches, 165 cm) height. The horses are broke to ride at 4 years old, and two years later, they are trained to harness. In order to be safe in the crowds they will experience in their 10 years of service, a placid temperament is mandatory, layered with extensive desensitization training.

Queen Victoria began the use of Windsor Grey horses to pull the royal carriages during her reign (1837-1901), and all subsequent British monarchs have continued the tradition. Most Windsor Greys are purebred or crossbred Irish Draught horses from Ireland, though some horses are bred at Hampton Court.

Two Windsor Greys pulled the procession carriage through Windsor for the 2018 wedding of Prince Harry and Meghan Markle. For the 2023 coronation of Charles III, six Windsor Greys drew the three-tonne Diamond Jubilee State Coach from Buckingham Palace to Westminster Abbey with three postilion riders, then eight Greys with four postilion drew the heavy four-tonne Gold State Coach back to the palace.

In the mid-1970s, the early days of the sport of combined driving, Crown Equerry Sir John Miller and Prince Philip, Duke of Edinburgh both competed with teams of four Greys from the Royal Mews.

Windsor Greys

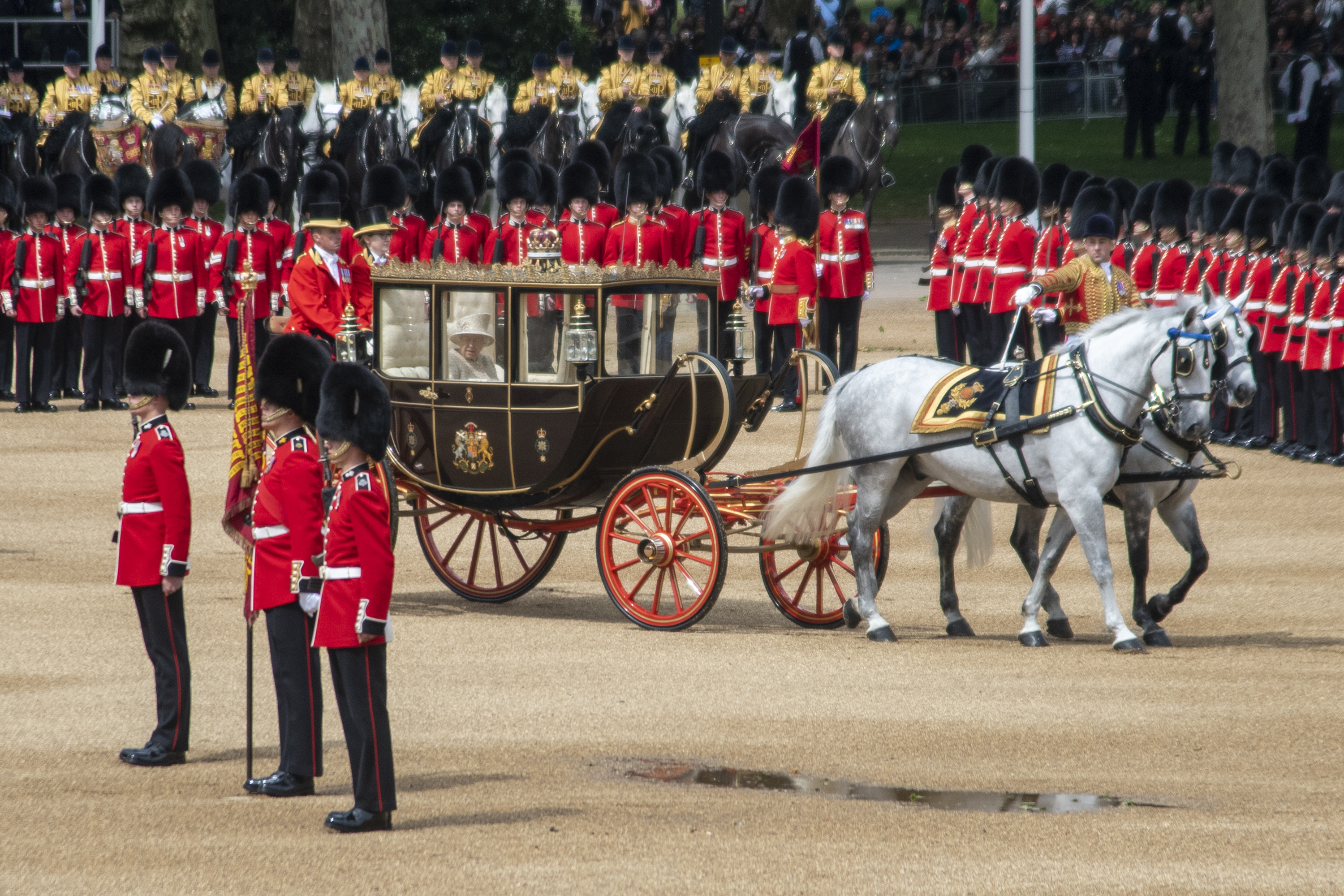
Trooping the Colour (2019)

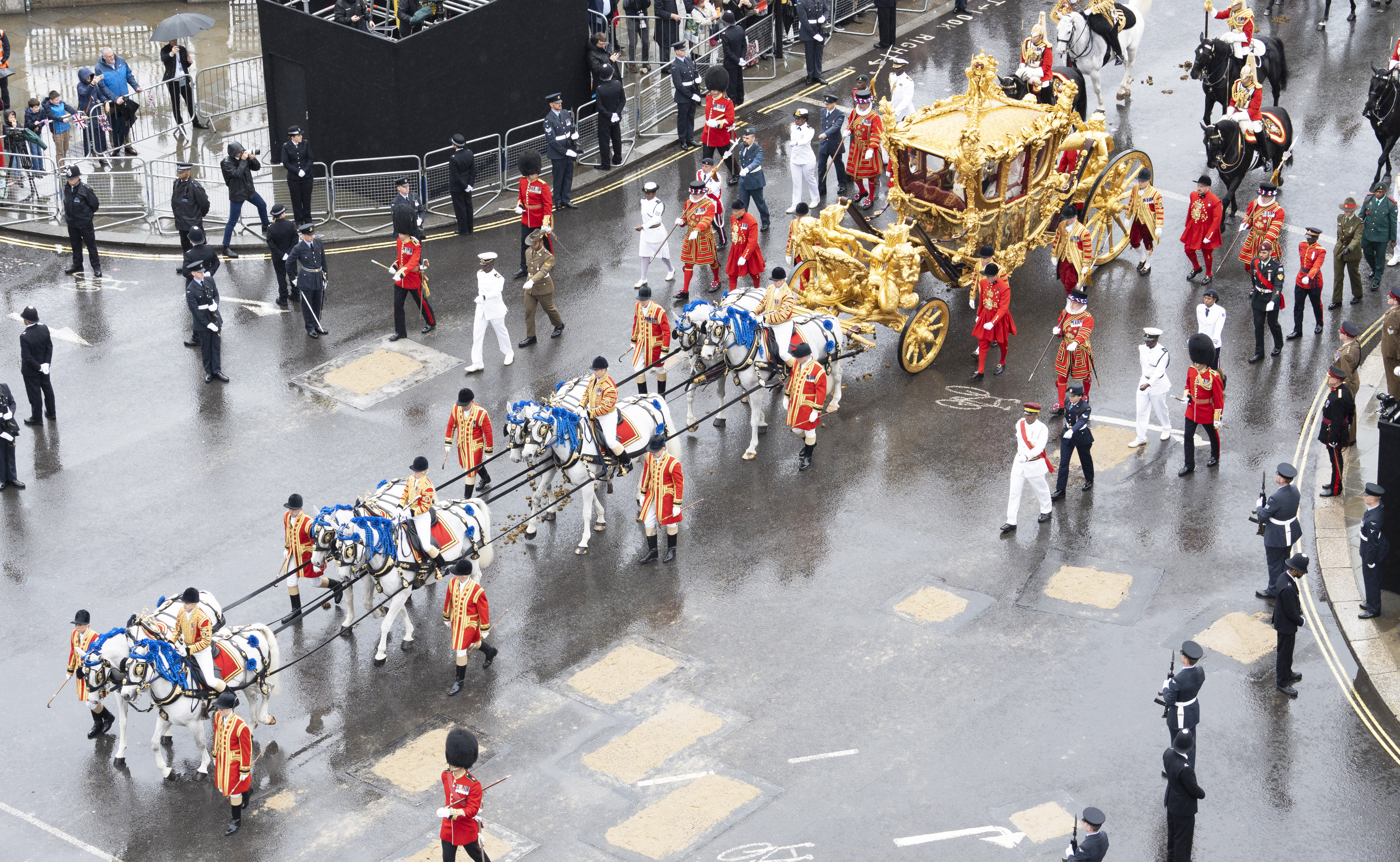
8 Greys pulling the Gold State Coach (2023)

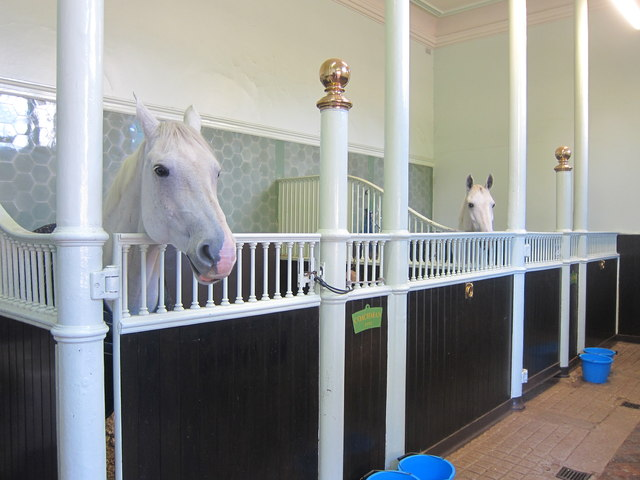
At the Royal Mews stables (2012)
