= 1902 State Landau =

Horse-drawn carriage used by the British royal family

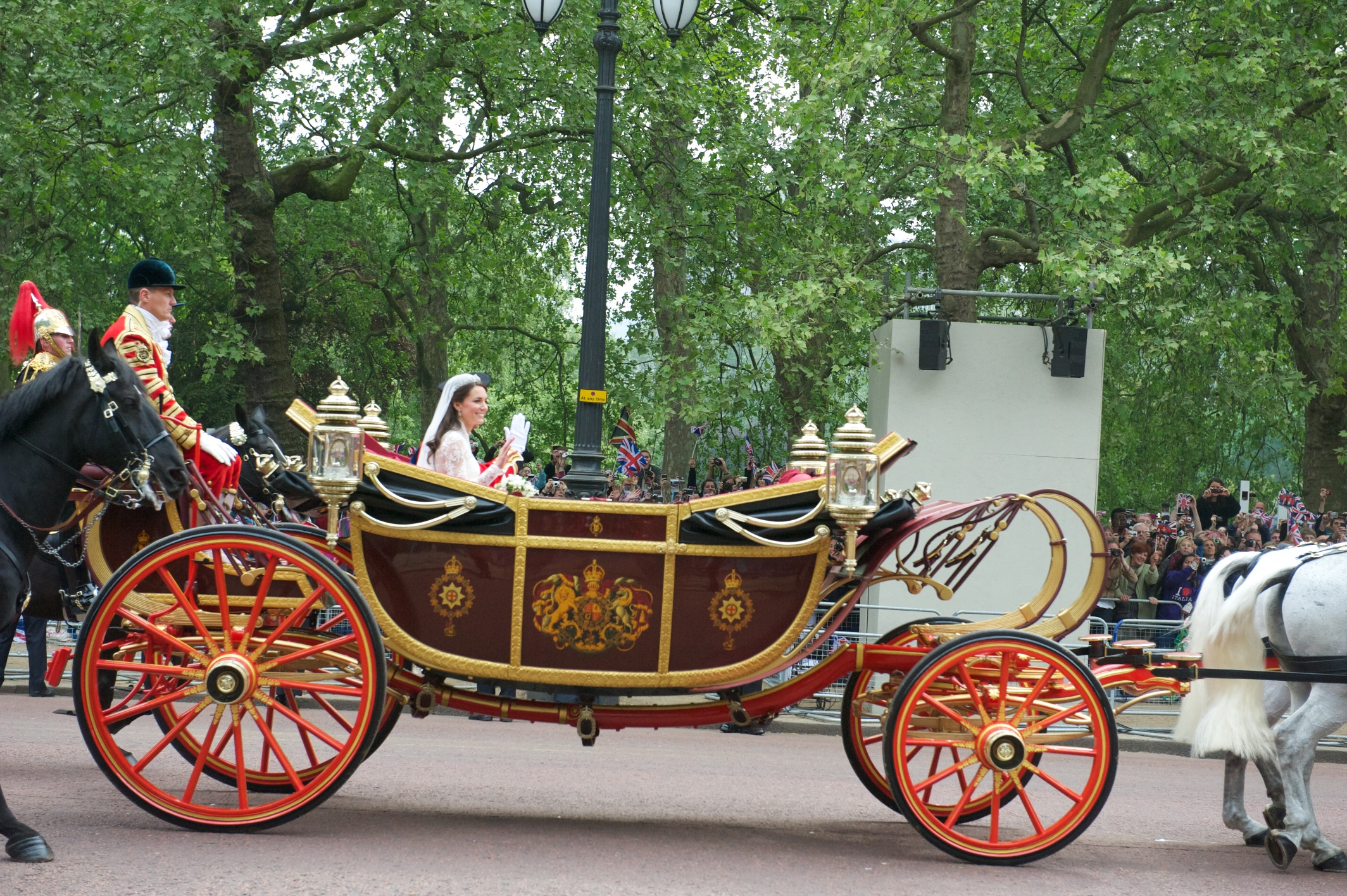
- Artist: Hooper (coachbuilder)
- Completion date: 1902
- Type: Landau
- Dimensions: (over 18 ft); long
- Condition: Conserved. In use.
- Location: Royal Mews
- Owner: The Crown

The United Kingdom's 1902 State Landau is a horse-drawn state carriage with flexible leather hoods which drop. It is a landau, drawn by six horses under the control of three postilions, with no seat for a coachman. In processions, it is normally used open, with the top lowered, giving spectators a better view of its passengers than provided by coaches and other closed vehicles.

== Description ==
The following description was published in 1905 by Walter Gilbey, founder and chairman of the London Cart Horse Parade Society and president of the Royal Agricultural Society.

[H]ardly less magnificent than [the 1761 Gold State Coach] is the new State landau built by Messrs Hooper for King Edward VII and first used by him on the day of his coronation procession through London.

This magnificent example of the coachbuilders' art is over 18 feet long. The body is hung upon C springs by strong braces covered with ornamentally stitched morocco; each brace is joined with a massive gilt buckle with oak leaf and crown device. Between the hind springs is a rumble for two footmen; there is no driving seat as the carriage is intended to be drawn only by horses ridden postillion. The panels are painted in purple lake considerably brighter than is usual in order to secure greater effect; marking the contours of the body and the outlines of the rumble are mouldings in wood carved and gilt, the design being one of over-lapping oak leaves.

The door panels, back and front panels, bear the Royal Arms with crown, supporters, mantle, motto, helmet and garter. On the lower quarter panel is the collar of the Order of the Garter, encircling its star and surmounted by the Tudor crown. Springing in a slow graceful curve from the under part of the body over the forecarriage is a "splasher" of crimson patent leather. Ornamental brass lamps are carried in brackets at each of the four corners of the body.

As regards the interior of this beautiful carriage it is upholstered in crimson satin and laces which were woven in Spitalfields; the hood is lined with silk, as better adapted than satin for folding. The rumble is covered with crimson leather. It is to be observed that with the exception of the pine and mahogany used for the panels, English-grown wood and English-made materials only have been used throughout.

While less ornate than the wonderful "gold coach" designed by Sir Wm Chambers and Cipriani in 1761, the new State landau, in its build, proportions, and adornment, is probably the most graceful and regal vehicle ever built.

— Sir Walter Gilbey

The 1902 State Landau

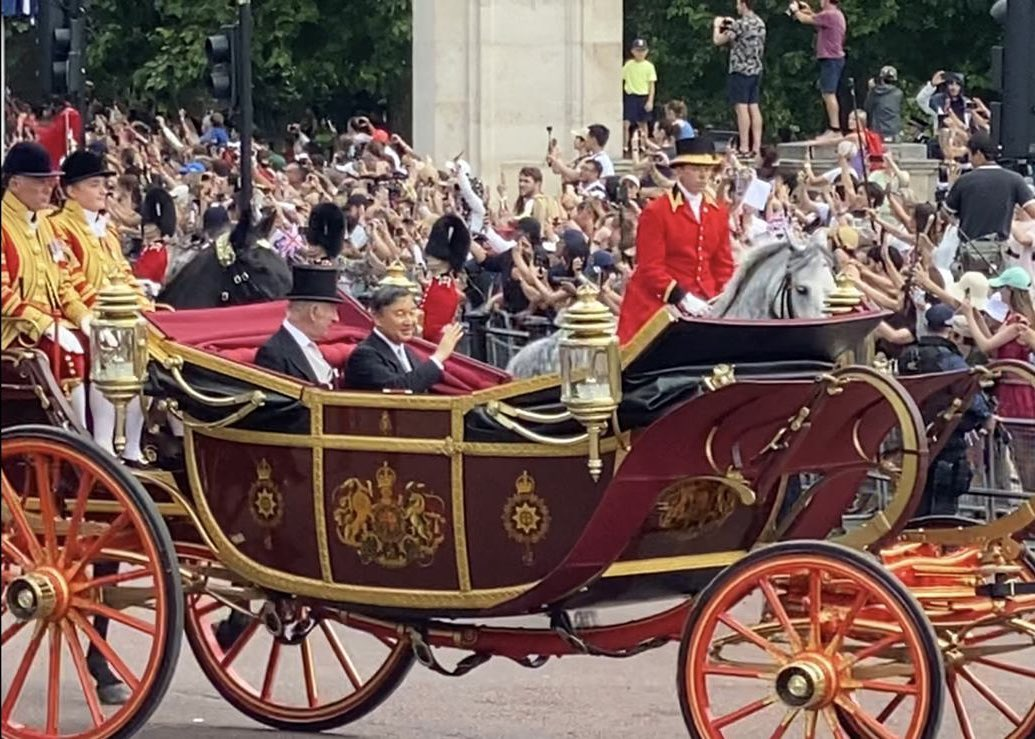
Front quarter view (Charles III)

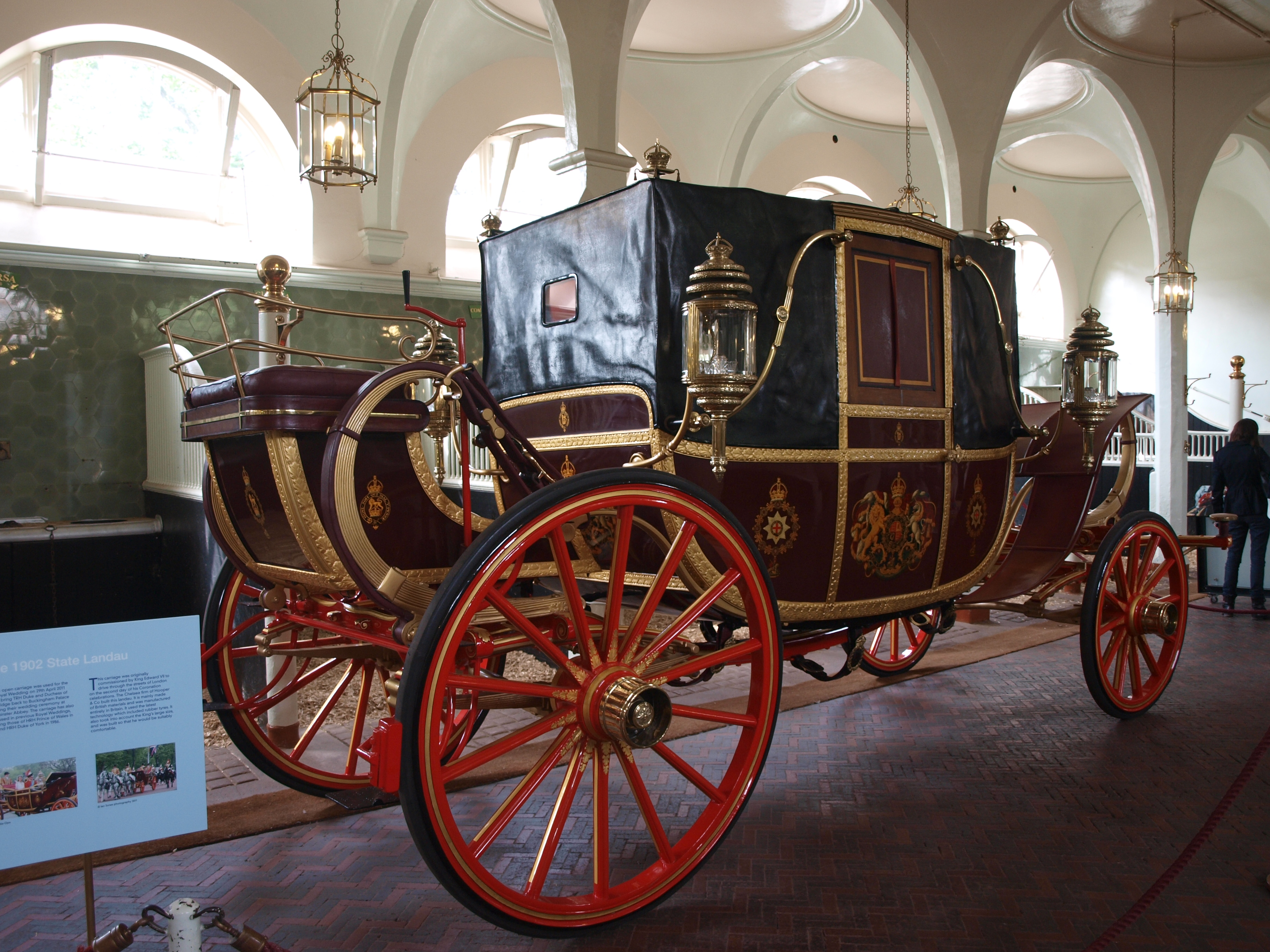
Rear quarter view with the hoods up

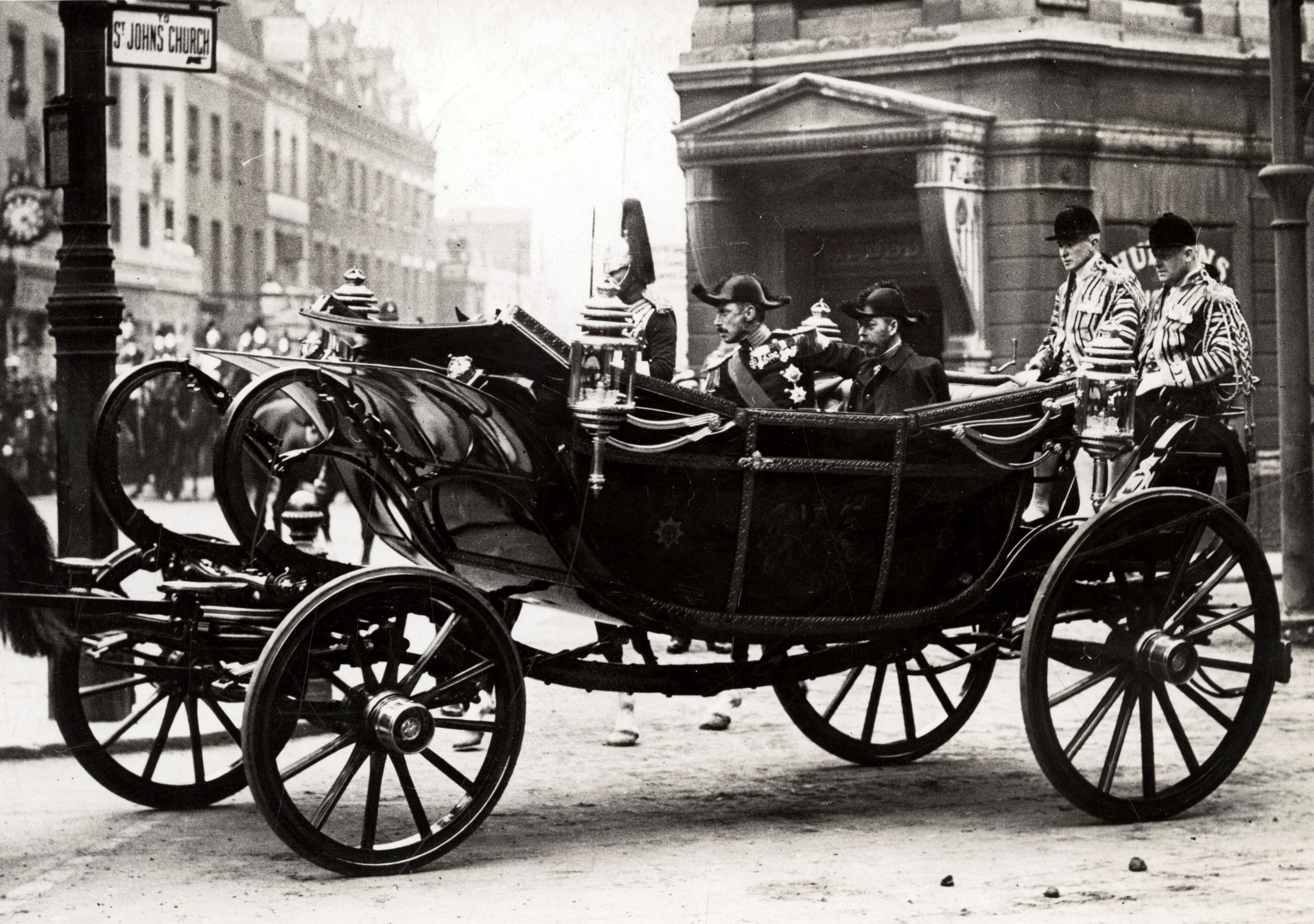
1914 with George V and Christian X of Denmark

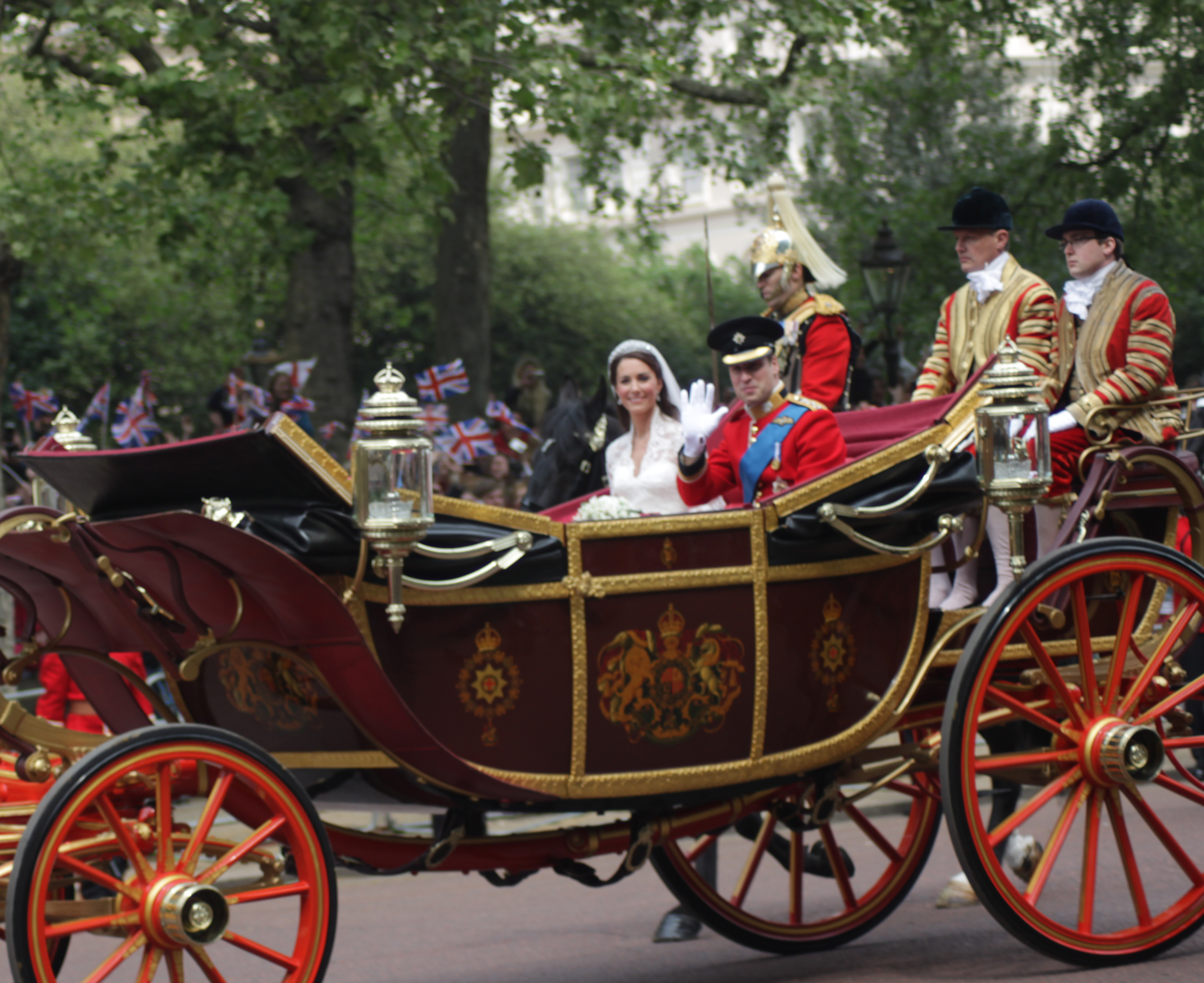
2011 wedding of William and Kate

== History ==
The carriage was built by Hooper in 1902 for the Coronation of Edward VII and Alexandra and given extra interior space. It was used regularly by Queen Elizabeth when meeting with heads of state. It is housed at the Royal Mews.

== Modern use ==
The 1902 State Landau is owned by the United Kingdom and set aside for the monarch's use within Britain. It is the largest carriage—not coach—used by the sovereign. In the past, the monarch has provided the landau to carry the heir apparent and his bride after their marriage. When rain threatens for an event, the Irish State Coach is substituted.

== See also ==
- List of state coaches
