= King Edward VII's Town Coach =

British royal carriage

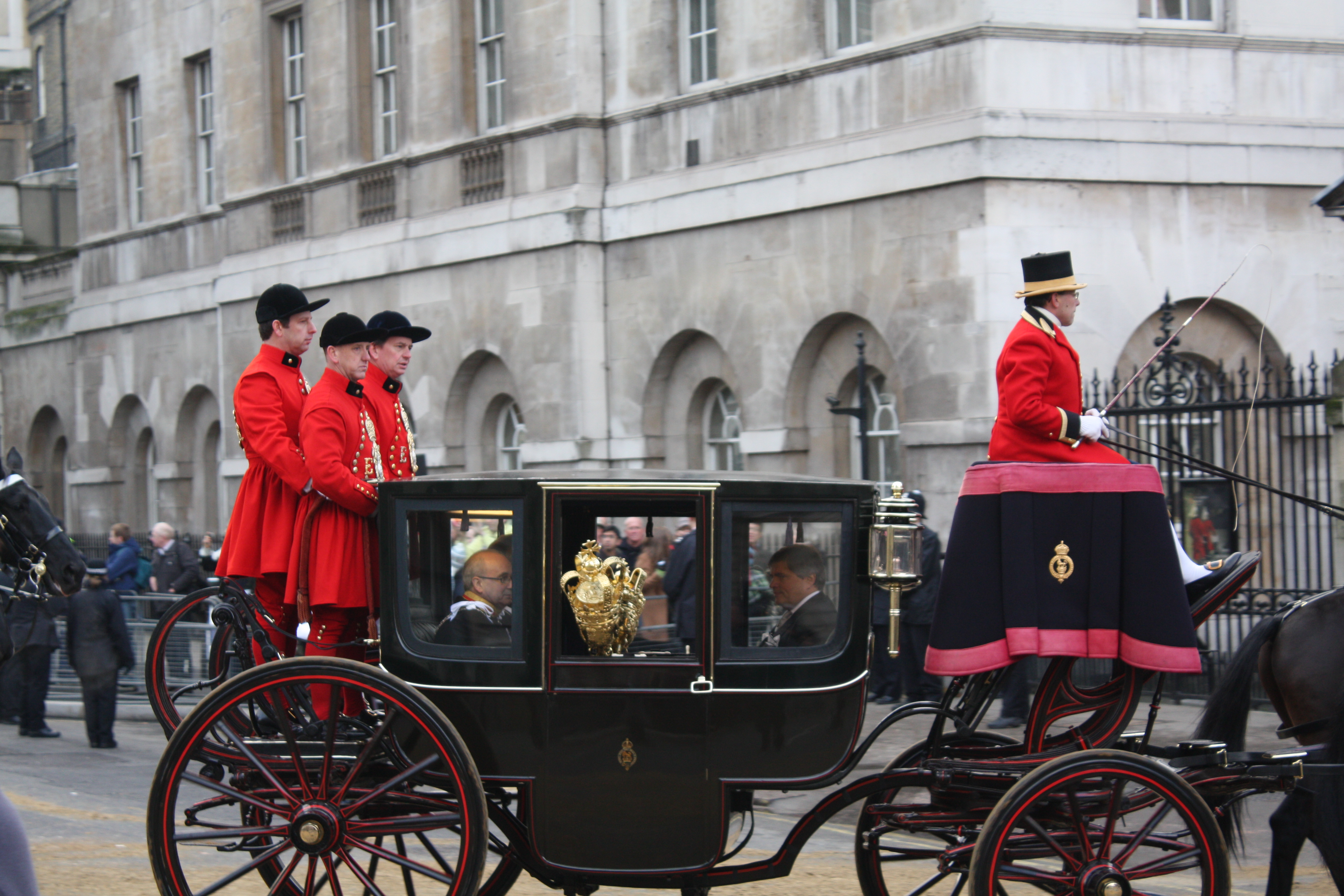
Edward VII's Town Coach conveying the maces at the State Opening of Parliament, 2008.

King Edward VII's Town Coach is a carriage of the Royal Mews, Buckingham Palace. Not being a state coach, it is much plainer than some of the other carriages kept at the Mews.

Formerly there were several similar town coaches in use, each with maroon-painted bodywork and a dark blue hammercloth. All were disposed of during the Second World War, with the exception of this one (named after Edward VII) which was put into storage. In 1964 it was restored, and at the same time four glass windows were added.
