= Royal Mews =

Stables attached to Buckingham Palace

Coordinates: 51°29′55″N 0°08′37″W

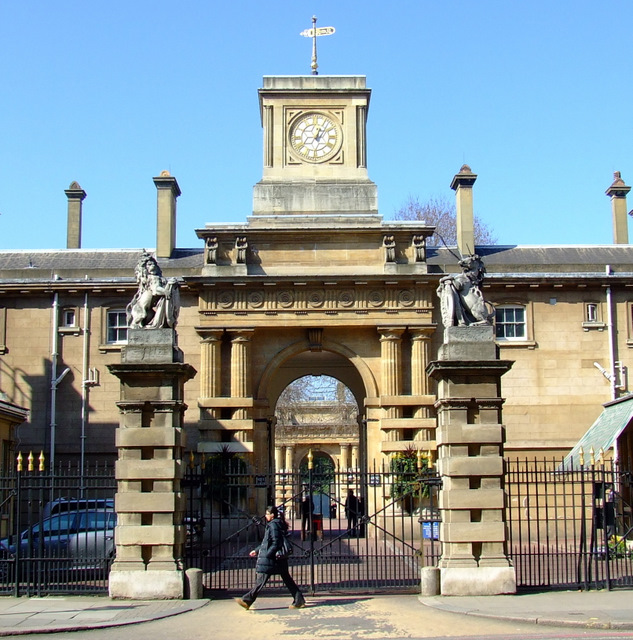
Entrance to the Royal Mews

The Royal Mews is a mews, or collection of equestrian stables of the British royal family. In London these stables and stable-hands' quarters have occupied two main sites in turn, being located at first on the north side of Charing Cross, and then (since the 1820s) within the grounds of Buckingham Palace.

The Royal Mews, Buckingham Palace, includes an extensive display of royal carriages and other associated items, and is open to the public for much of the year. It is also a working part of the palace, where horses and people live and work, and where carriages and cars are in daily use supporting the work of the monarch as head of state.

The titular head of the Royal Mews is the Master of the Horse (one of the three great officers of the Royal Household). The executive head is the Crown Equerry, who lives on site and oversees the Royal Mews Department (which is a department of the Royal Household).

== History ==
=== At Charing Cross ===
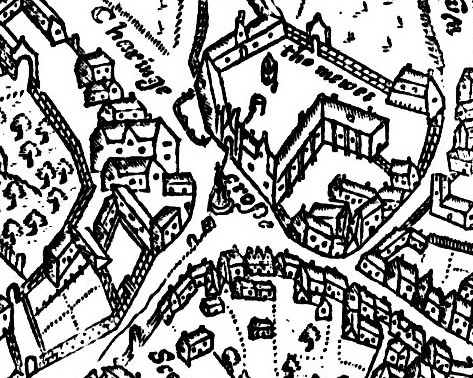
"The mewes" (top right) at Charing Cross, depicted on John Norden's map of Westminster, 1593. The map is oriented with north-west to the top.

The first set of stables to be referred to as a mews was at Charing Cross at the western end of The Strand. The royal hawks were kept at this site from 1377 and the name originates from the fact that they were confined there at moulting time ("mew" being derived from the French verb "muer", to moult).

In the Tudor Period, the Royal Stables were located in Lomesbury (present-day Bloomsbury). In 1534 they were destroyed by fire, whereupon the King, Henry VIII, decided to rebuild the Charing Cross mews as a stables (the hawks having been given alternative accommodation). It kept its former name when it acquired this new function. On old maps, such as the "Woodcut" map of London of the early 1560s, the Mews can be seen extending back towards the site of today's Leicester Square.

When George I came to the throne in 1714 he brought with him to London the famous cream stallions which he was wont to use as Elector of Hanover. Bred at the Royal Stud at Hampton Court, these horses pulled state carriages in England for the next two hundred years (except for a hiatus during the Napoleonic wars when George III used black stallions in protest at the French occupation of Hanover).

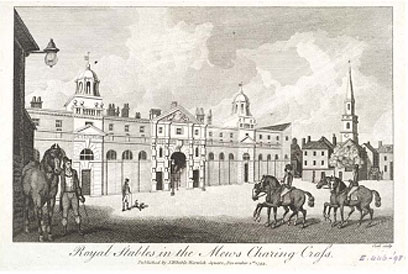
The 'Royal Stables in the Mews, Charing Cross' in 1793.

The mews was rebuilt again in 1732 to the designs of William Kent, and in the early 19th century it was open to the public. This building was usually known as the King's Mews (or Queen's Mews when there was a woman on the throne), but was also sometimes referred to as the Royal Mews or the Royal Stables.

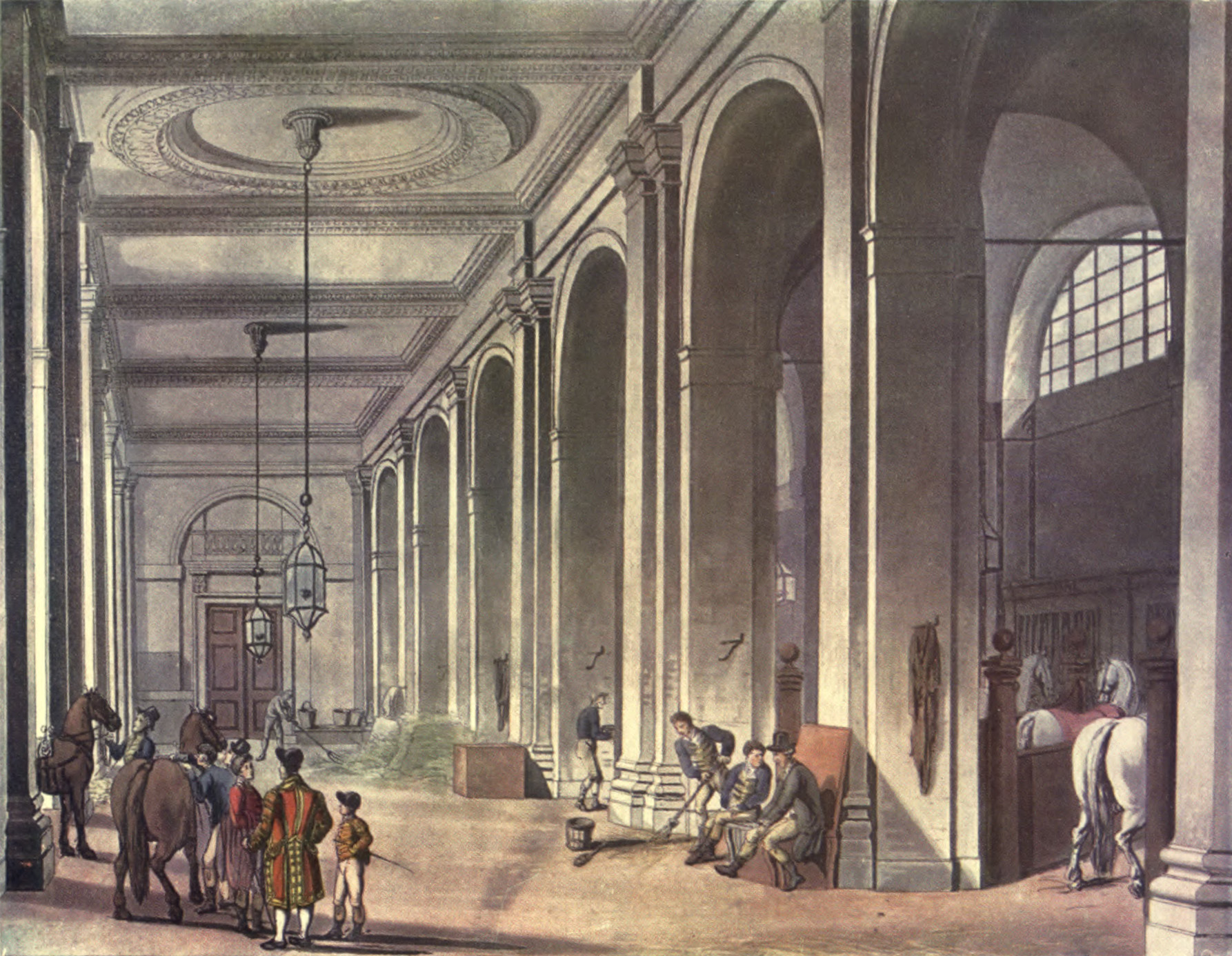
The King's Mews in 1809 (an etching by Rowlandson and Pugin).

Kent's redesign was a classical building occupying the northern half of the site, with an open space in front of it that ranked among the few large ones in central London at a time when the Royal Parks were on the fringes of the city and most squares in London were garden squares open only to the residents of their surrounding houses.

On 15 June 1820, the Guards in the Royal Mews mutinied in support of Caroline of Brunswick, whom King George IV was seeking to divorce.

The whole site was cleared in the late 1820s to create Trafalgar Square, laid out in 1837–1844 after delays, and the National Gallery which opened in 1838.

=== At Buckingham Palace ===
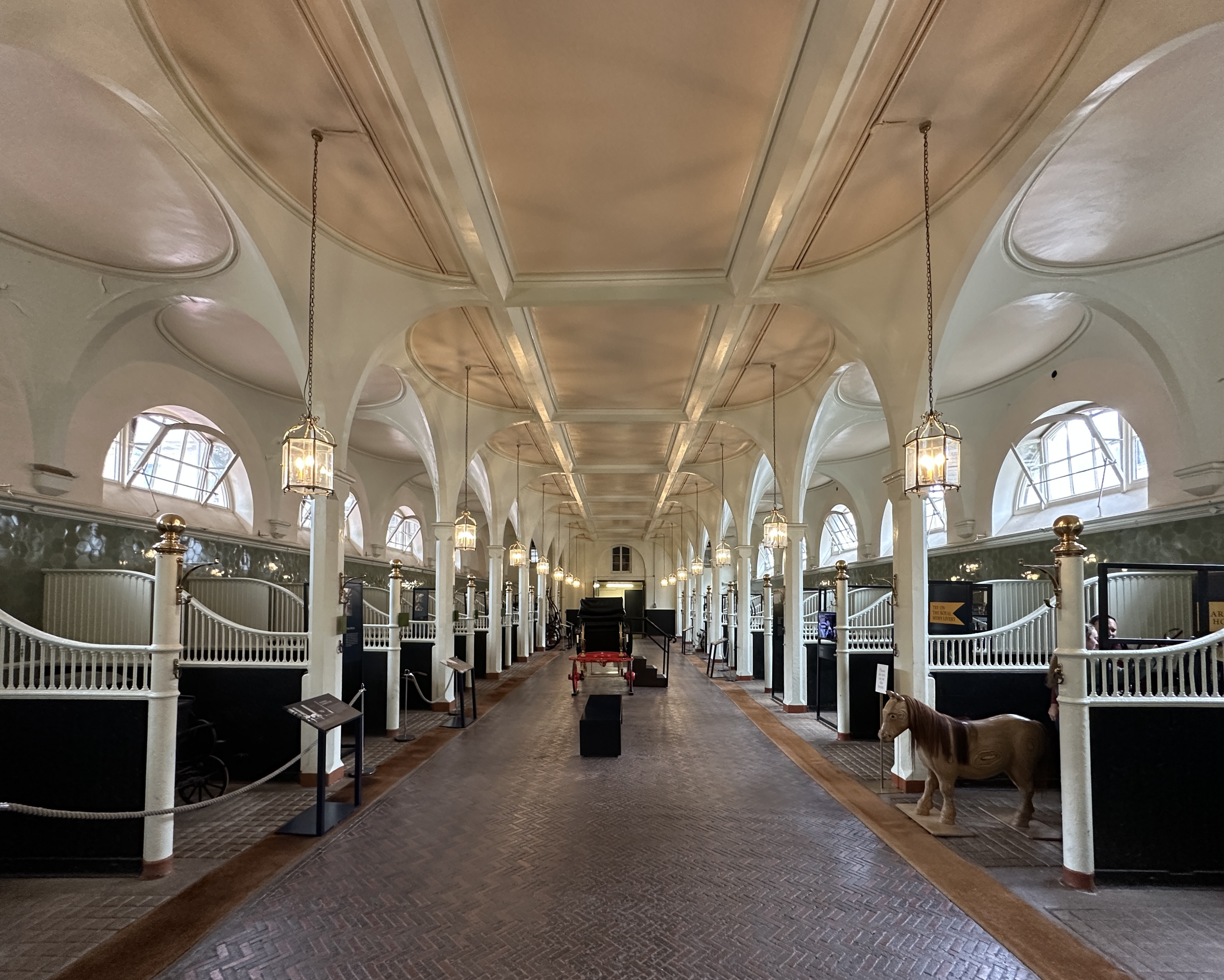
Stables in the Royal Mews

The present Royal Mews is in the grounds of Buckingham Palace, to the south of Buckingham Palace Gardens, near Grosvenor Place.

In the 1760s George III moved some of his day-to-day horses and carriages to the grounds of Buckingham House, which he had acquired in 1762 for his wife's use. The Riding School, thought to be by William Chambers, dates from this period (it was completed in 1764; the pediment, with sculptural motifs by William Theed, was added in 1859). The main royal stables housing the ceremonial coaches and their horses remained at the King's Mews, Charing Cross; however, when his son George IV had Buckingham Palace converted into the main royal residence in the 1820s the whole stables establishment was moved there.

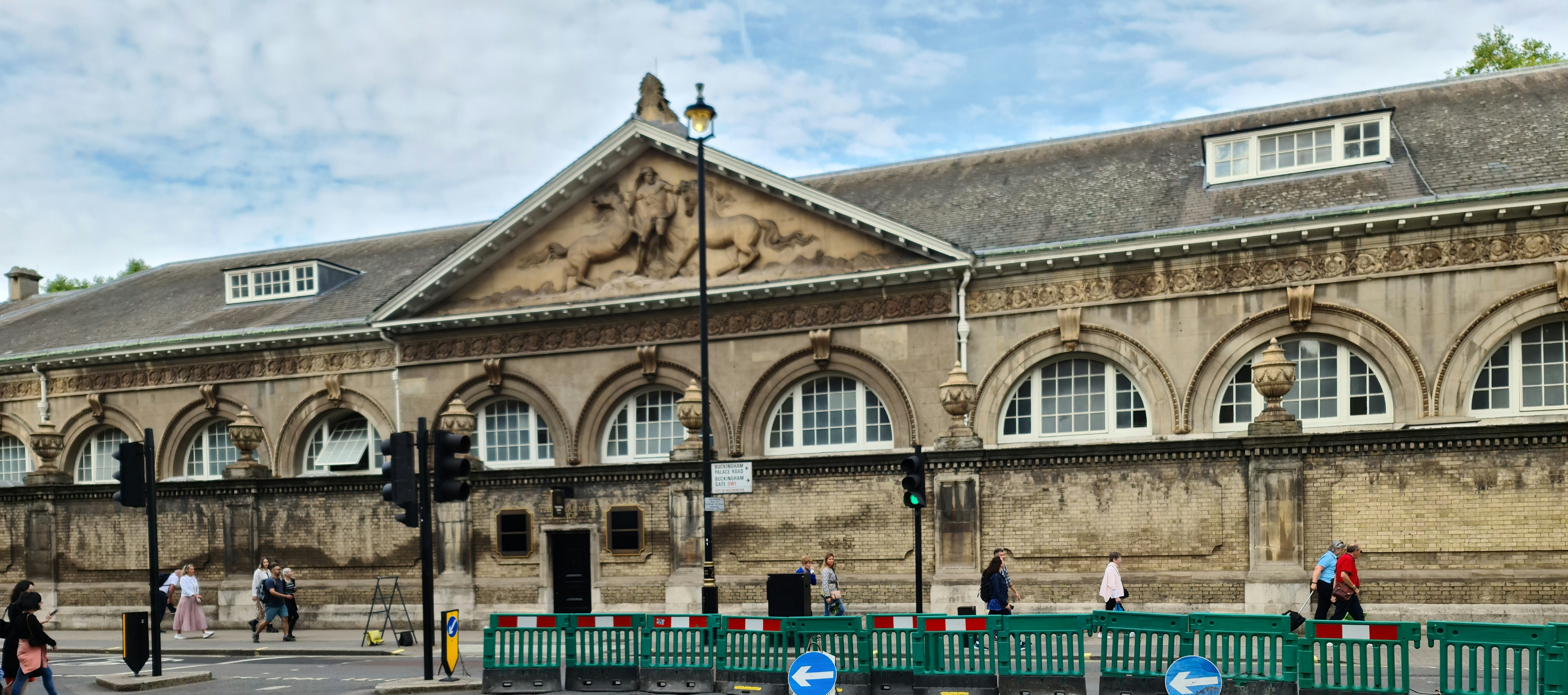
The Riding School seen from Buckingham Palace Road.

The current Royal Mews was built to designs by John Nash and was completed in 1825 (though the mews buildings have been modified extensively since). The main quadrangle was laid out with coach houses on the east side, and stable blocks (alternating with harness and forage rooms) on the west. Beyond it, the 'back mews' included accommodation for a veterinary surgeon.

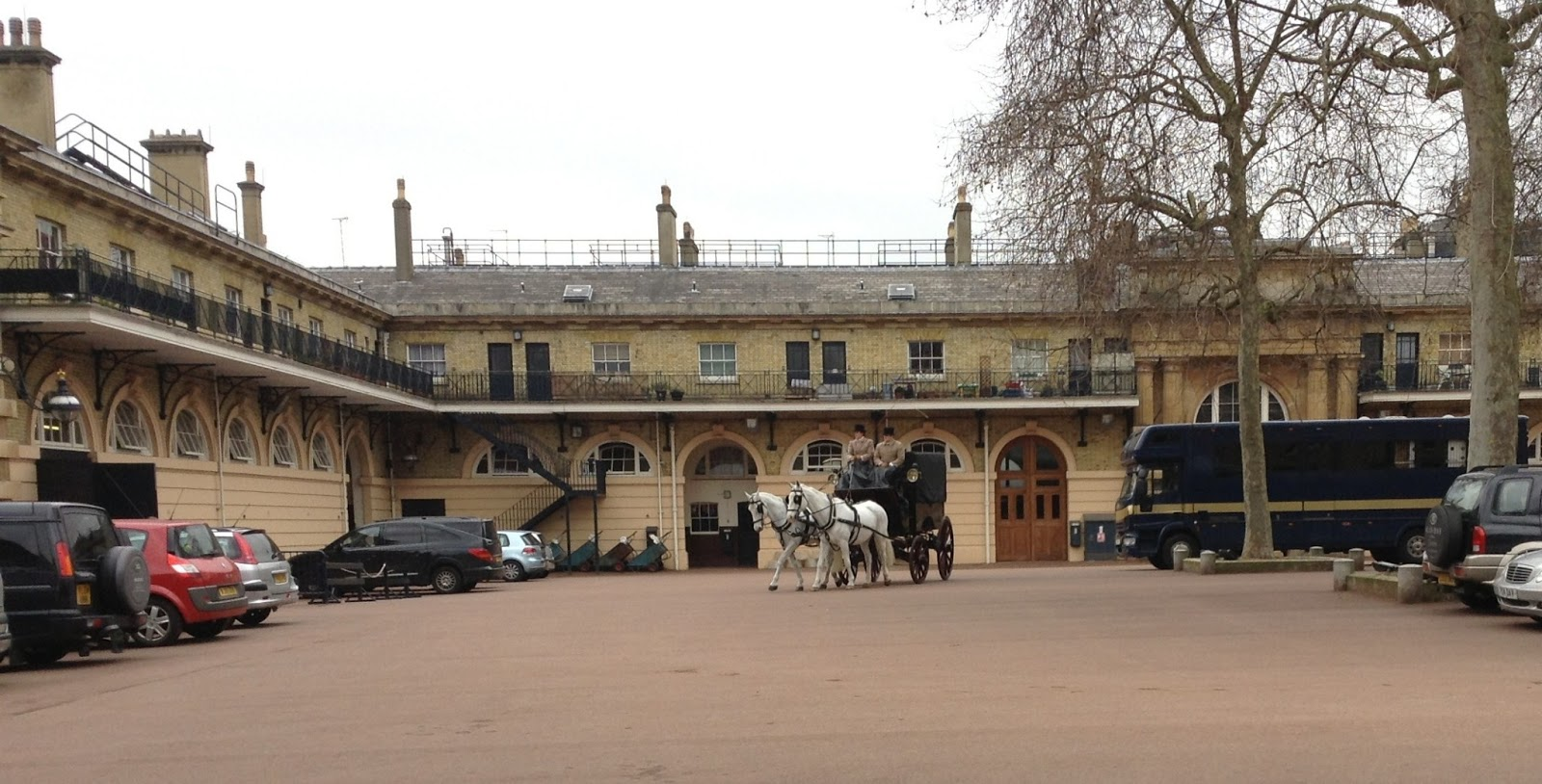
The Main Quadrangle in 2015.

When Victoria came to the throne in 1837, Buckingham Palace became the monarch's principal residence. Prince Albert used the back mews for stabling his own horses (for riding and driving). By the 1850s there were just under two hundred people employed at the mews, most of whom lived on site with their families. Standing either side of the entrance were official residences (one for the Crown Equerry, the other for the Clerk of the Stables); other staff were accommodated in rooms above the stables and carriage houses. In 1855 Queen Victoria established a Buckingham Palace Royal Mews School, for the education of the workers' children.

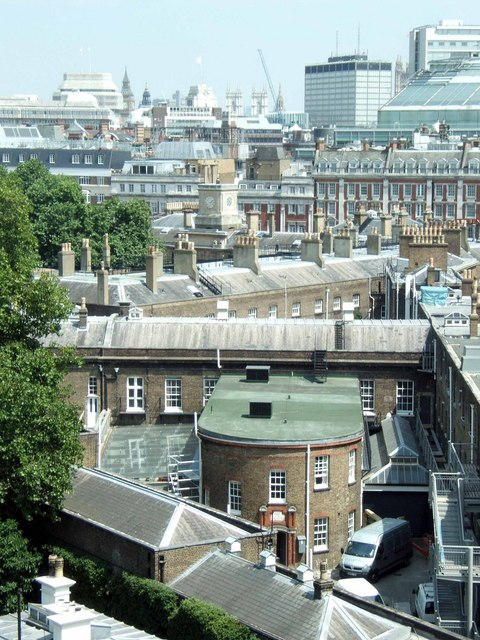
Back Mews (foreground).

Under Victoria's successor, King Edward VII, motor vehicles were introduced into the mews. In 1904, the Crown Equerry wrote to the Office of Works to request the conversion of 'two small coach-houses in the Back Mews' into 'a suitable Motor House [...] with a Lantern roof, hot water heating apparatus and electric lighting'. The conversion duly took place, and accommodation was provided nearby for the chauffeurs.

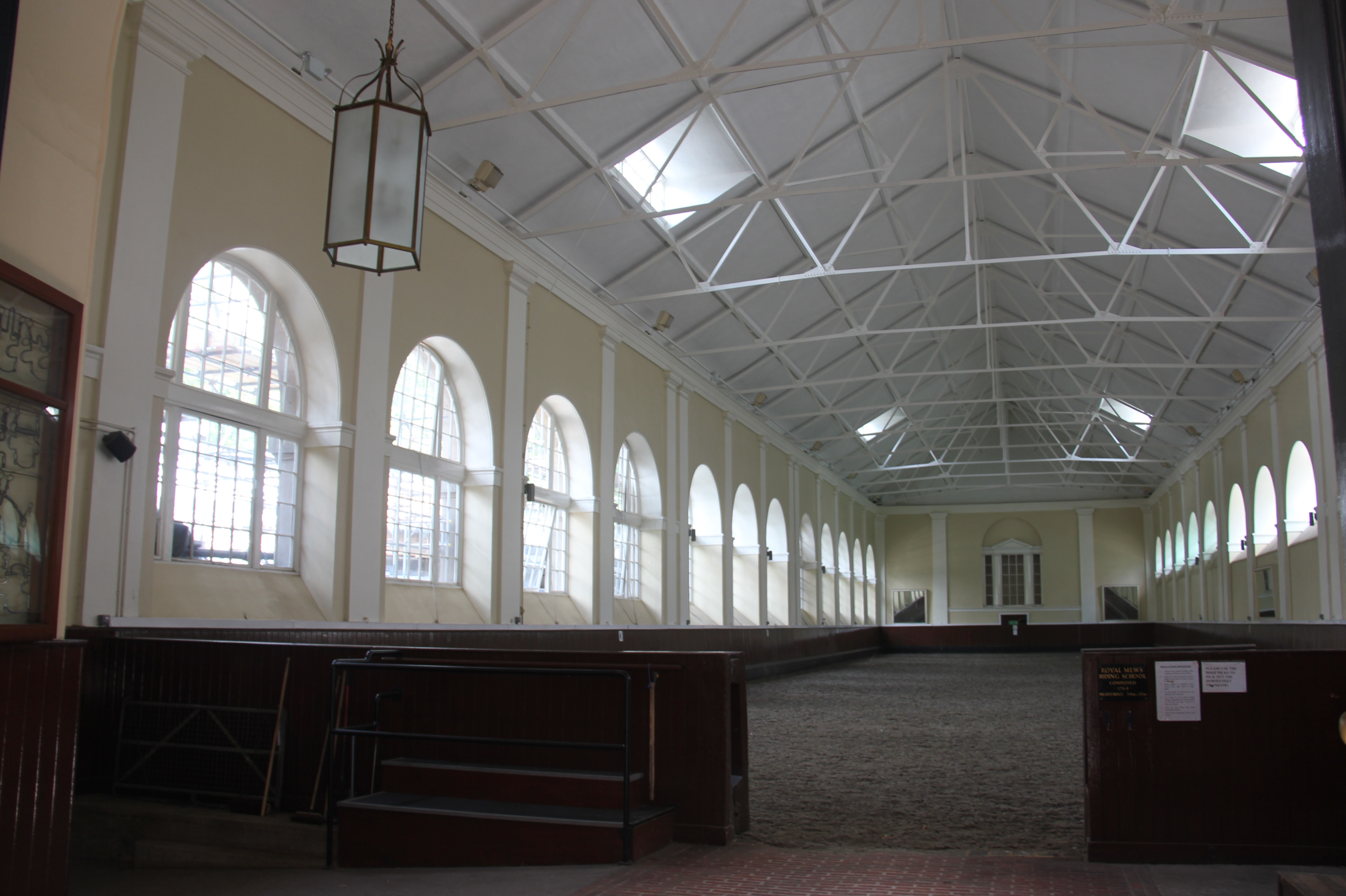
The Royal Mews Riding School (of 1764) measures 54m x 15m.

In the early 20th century problems had arisen due to inbreeding of the Hanoverian creams. In 1920 they were withdrawn from use and in their place, for the rest of the decade, bay horses took pride of place in the Mews. In the early 1930s, however, King George V began using grey horses for the lead carriages in state and ceremonial processions; his son and heir Edward VIII moved the grey horses from Windsor (where they had been used for many years by the Royal Family for their private carriages) to London, where they were nicknamed the 'Windsor Greys'.

By 1936 motor vehicles were in the ascendency, and following his accession to the throne Edward VIII disposed of several of the more 'day to day' carriages. George VI made more disposals after the Second World War: for example, sixteen plain Edwardian town coaches were sold off at this time (just one remained, stored away at Windsor; it was later rediscovered, glazed and restored to royal use). A total of nineteen carriages were purchased by Sir Alexander Korda after the war, for use as film props; of these, five Clarences were borrowed back in 1953 for the coronation (to supplement five identical carriages which had been retained by the Mews). The coronation that year involved thirty-four coaches and carriages with seventy-eight horses in harness.

In 1988 a new state coach was presented to the Mews, the Australian State Coach, built by former Mews employee W. J. Frecklington as part of the Australian Bicentenary celebrations; it was the first new royal state coach to be built since the 1902 State Landau. At that time, despite the earlier disposals, the Royal Mews still had custody of over a hundred vehicles, with all but a dozen being in working order; the majority were in London or Windsor, with others spread around the other royal residences.

=== Present day ===
As well as being a full-time working facility, the Royal Mews, Buckingham Palace, is regularly open to the public. The state coaches and other carriages are kept there, along with about 30 horses, together with their modern counterparts: the state motor cars. Coachmen, grooms, chauffeurs and other staff are accommodated in flats above the carriage houses and stables.

In late 2025, it was announced that the Royal Mews (including stables, carriages and cars) would be relocated from Buckingham Palace to Windsor Castle, as 'senior members of the Royal Family no longer live in the capital'.

== Locations ==
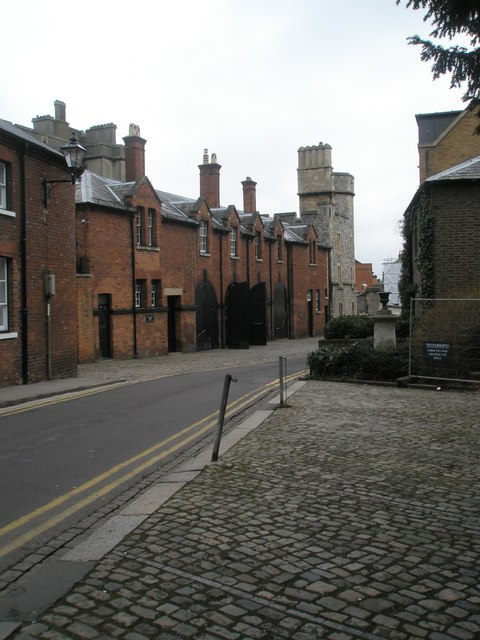
Entrance to the Royal Mews, Windsor Castle

The Royal Mews is an institution that operates across multiple sites. Its primary headquarters has been at Buckingham Palace since the 1820s, although since late 2025 a significant portion of its operations has begun shifting to Windsor.

The Royal Mews at Windsor Castle is where the Ascot carriages are normally kept, together with vehicles used in Windsor Great Park. Some riding horses are also stabled there.

In Scotland, at Holyrood Palace, the Royal Mews is situated in Abbey Strand. It is one of the oldest parts of the palace, and is still used whenever royal carriages are used in Edinburgh.

Also in London is the Royal Mews at Hampton Court Palace which overlooks Hampton Court Green. It provides accommodation for royal staff, and horses are stabled there from time to time. It is not open to the public.

Historically, the old stables of St James's Palace, which stood where Lancaster House is now, were also sometimes referred to as the Royal Mews.

== Carriage horses ==
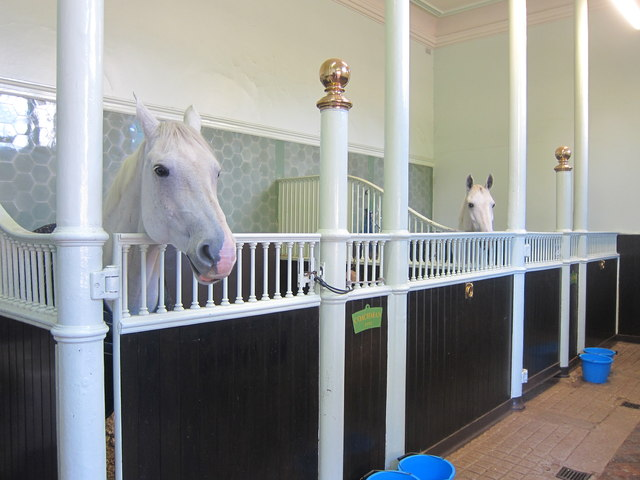
Windsor Greys at the Royal Mews, Buckingham Palace.

The complement of horses in the Royal Mews includes around a dozen Windsor Greys and eighteen Cleveland Bays. The greys are used for pulling carriages containing the monarch; the bays are used for everyone else. The horses are regularly exercised, and are used for competitive and recreational driving as well as for ceremonial duties. The manure that is produced by the horses is used by the adjacent Buckingham Palace Garden.

== Carriages and coaches ==
A Royal Mews Brougham on display alongside a station bus at Holyrood Palace in Edinburgh

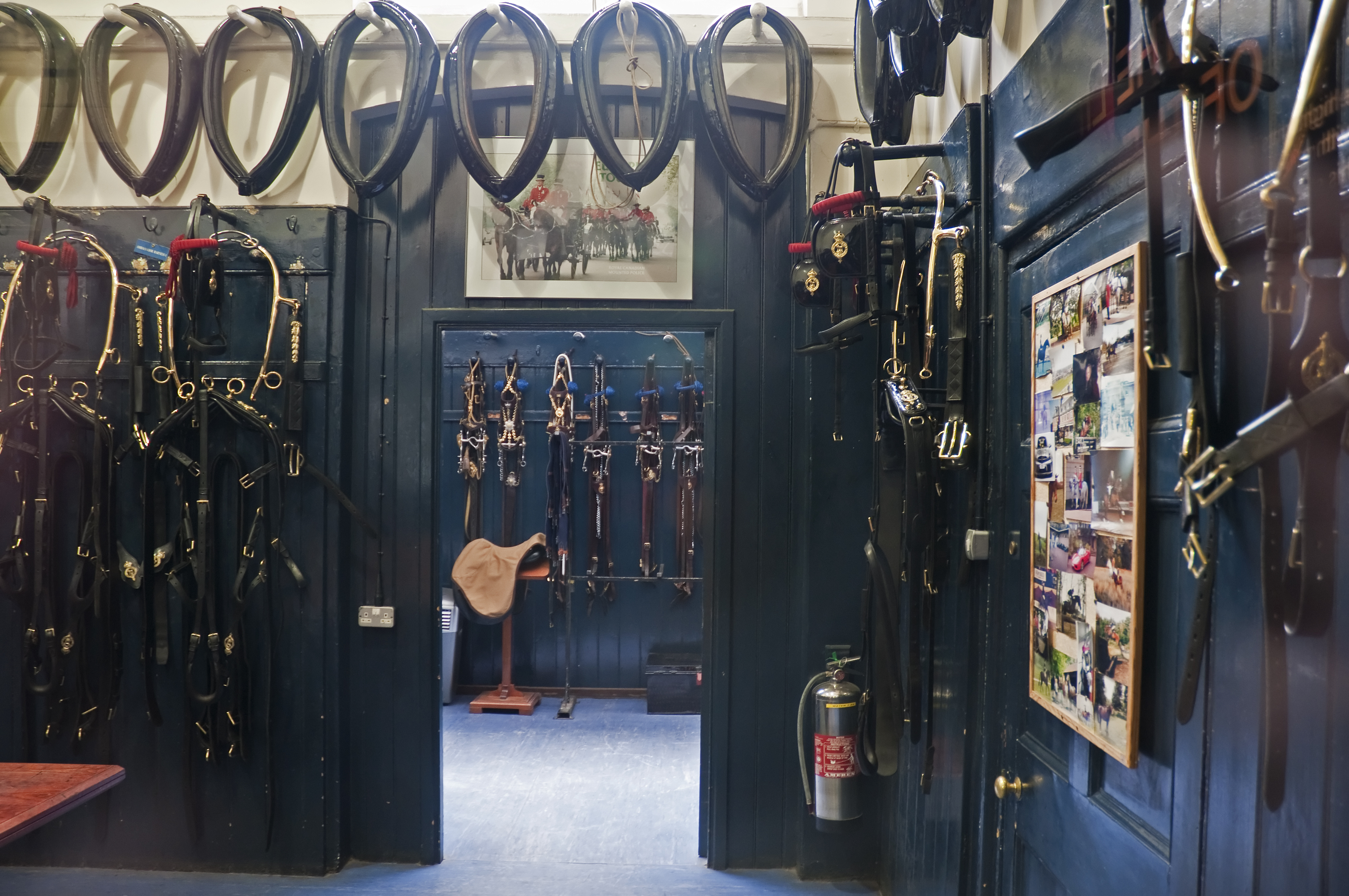
Working tack room at the Royal Mews in London showing driving and riding equipment

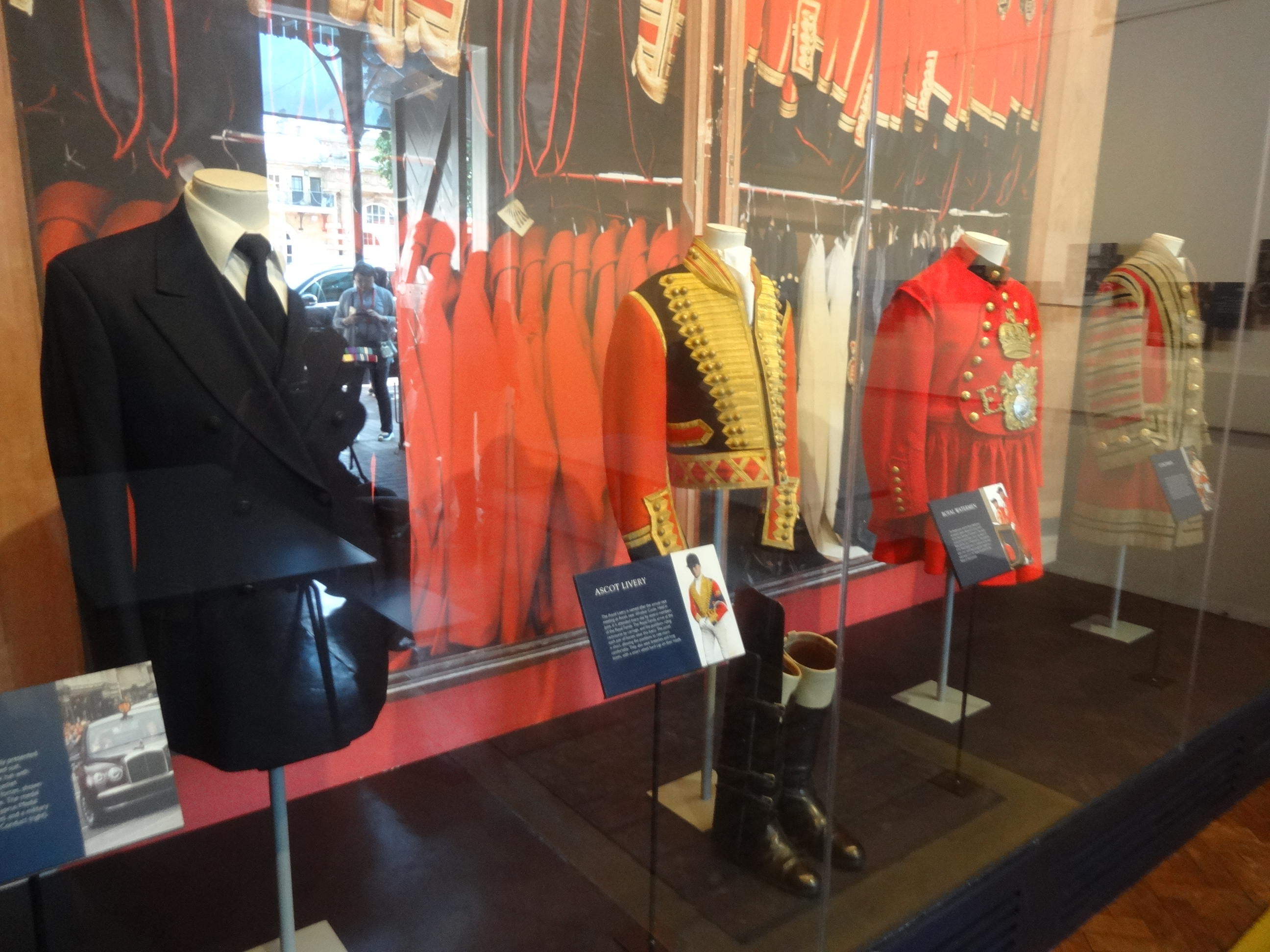
Part of the liveries collection

Vehicles in the care of the Royal Mews are listed below. A good number are on public display, though not all are kept in London. Most are in regular use, and some (for example, the broughams) are driven on a daily basis. (Note: Since 1843, the daily messenger brougham has set out from the Royal Mews to collect and deliver post between Buckingham Palace and St James's Palace.) Others (above all the Gold Coach) are only used on great and rare state occasions. The list includes vehicles for personal, recreational and sporting use, as well as those designed and kept for state occasions.

- State coaches
  - Australian State Coach
  - Diamond Jubilee State Coach
  - Glass Coach
  - Gold State Coach
  - Irish State Coach
  - Queen Alexandra's State Coach
  - Scottish State Coach
- King Edward VII's Town Coach
- Several landau carriages including: the 1902 State Landau, seven other state landaus, five semi-state landaus, and five Ascot landaus
- Barouches and sociables
- Broughams and clarences
- Phaetons and victorias, including the Ivory Mounted Phaeton
- Sporting carriages, including a rare curricle
- Recreational vehicles, such as the Louis-Philippe charabanc
- A variety of pony carriages, drags and exercise vehicles

In less regular use is Queen Victoria's state sledge, one of a number of royal sleighs in the Mews.

Also on display are historic liveries and harnesses, which are regularly used and kept in excellent condition. These range from the plainer items used for exercising and working horses to the ornamented state liveries and harnesses designed for use with the state coaches.

Some of the carriages maintained by the Royal Mews
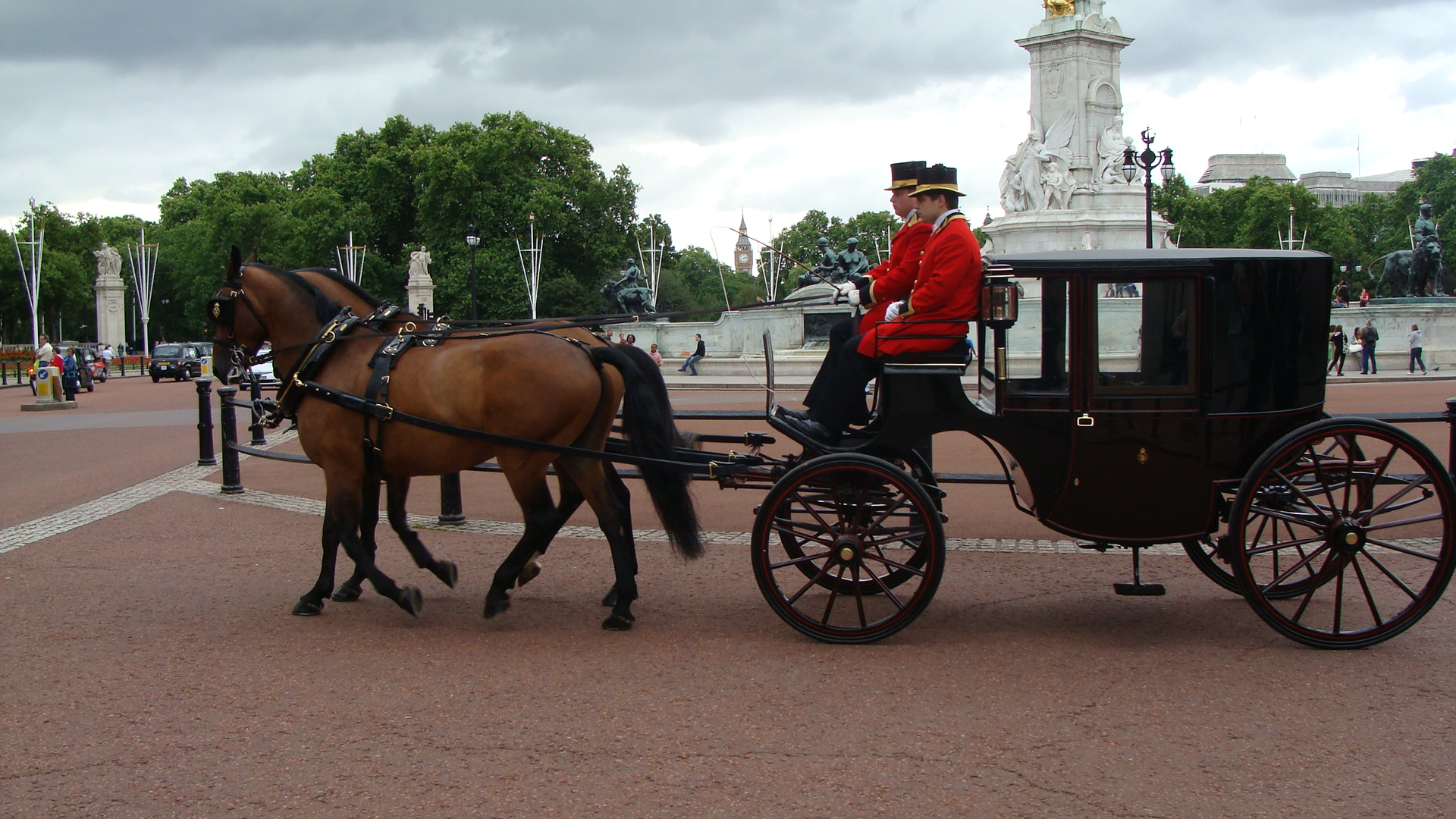
A clarence from the Royal Mews, drawn by a pair of Cleveland Bay horses, passing the Victoria Memorial. (A clarence is a larger-than-standard, two-horse brougham.)

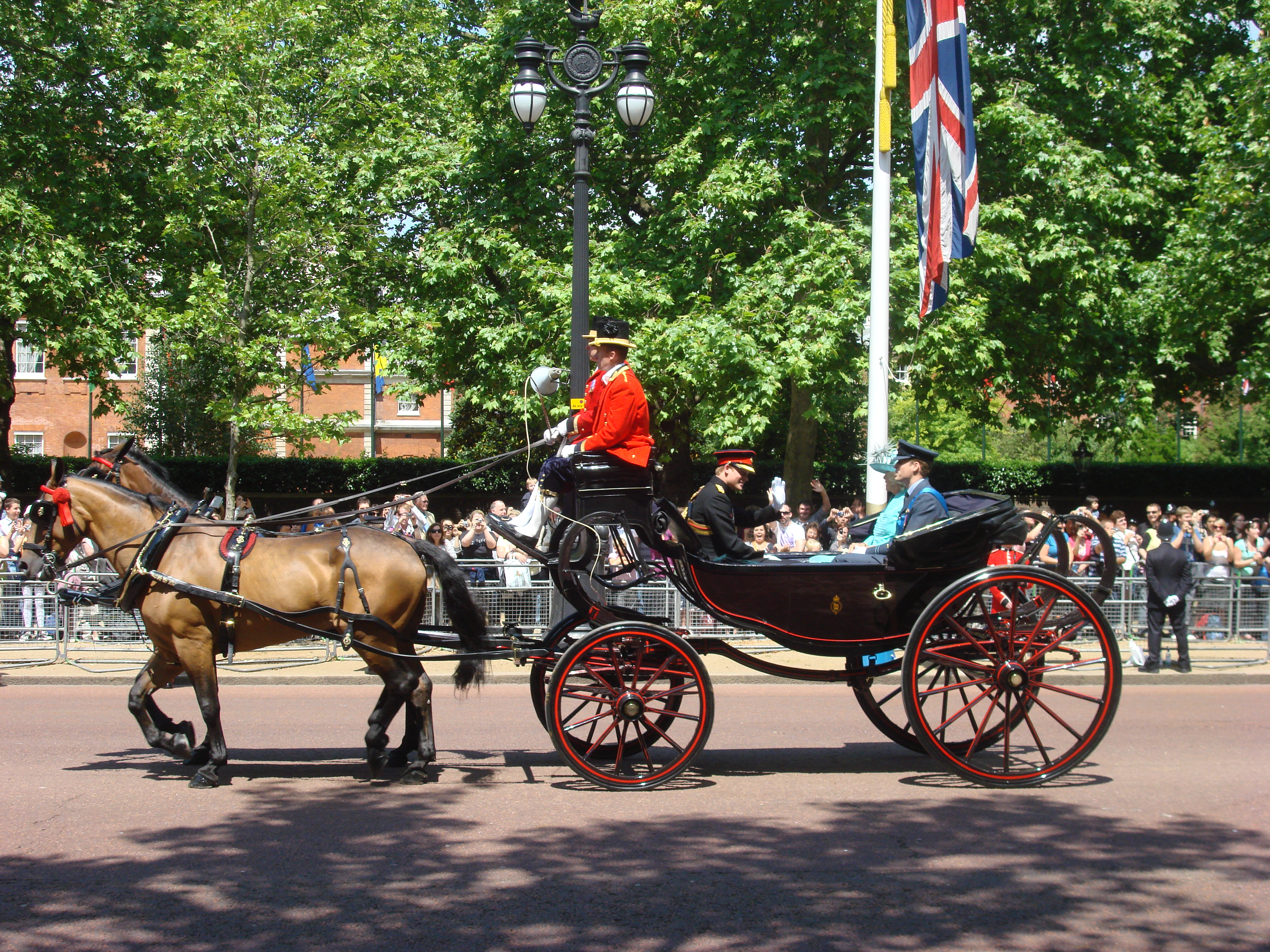
One of two Royal Mews barouches carrying members of the Royal Family at the 2009 Trooping the Colour.

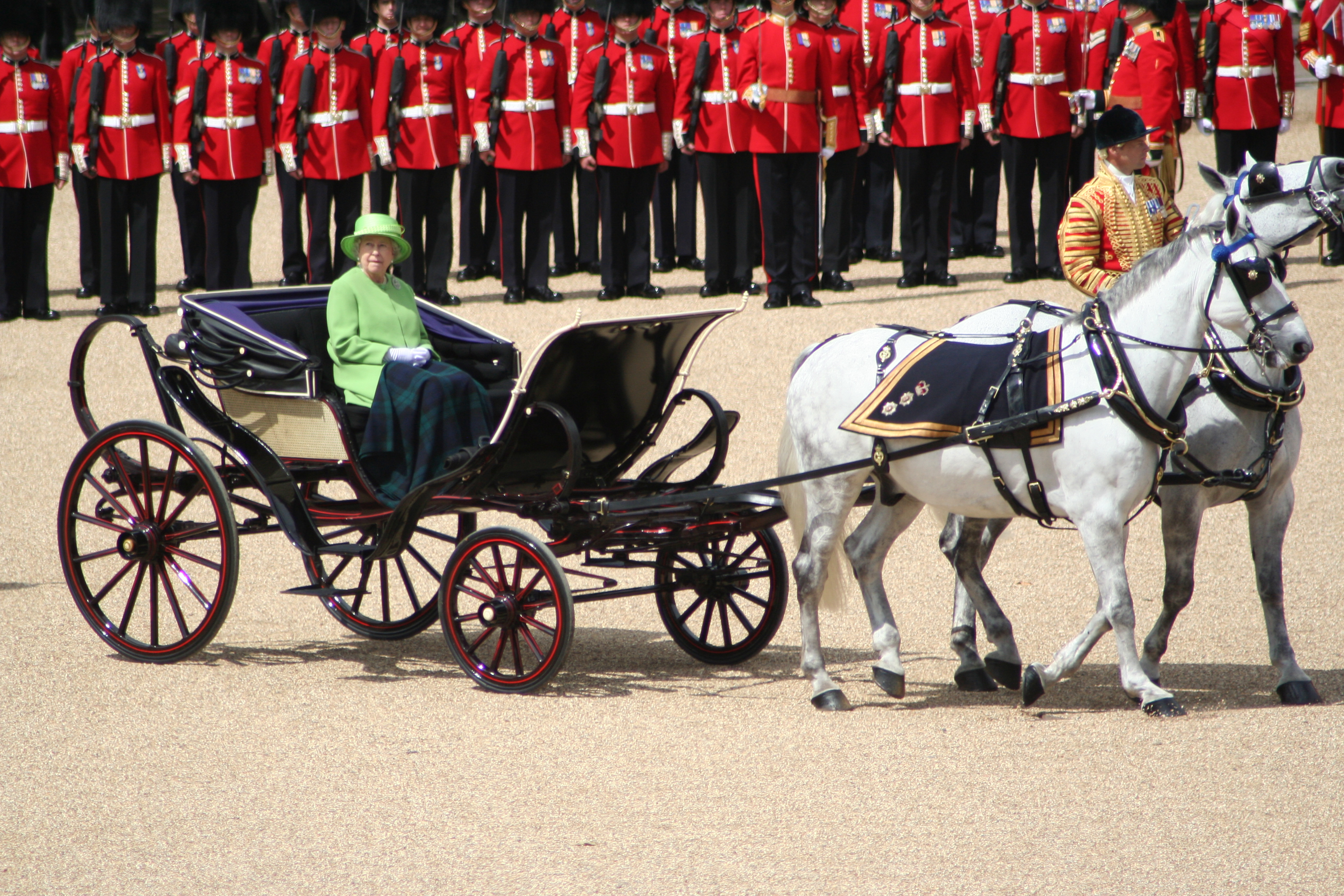
Queen Elizabeth II riding in a phaeton, drawn by Windsor Grey horses, at the 2007 Trooping the Colour. (This carriage is known as the "Ivory Mounted Phaeton".)

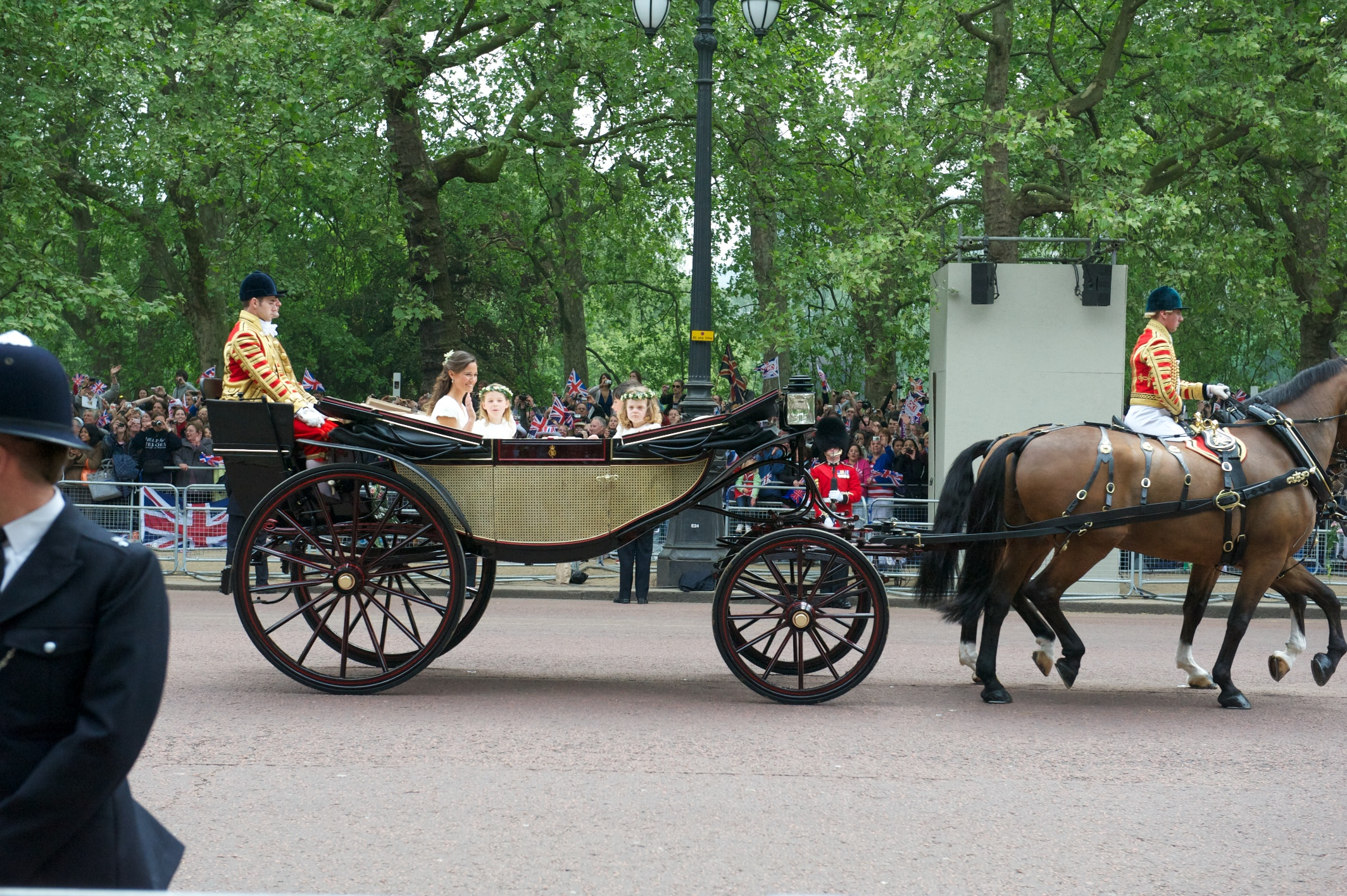
"Ascot" landau conveying bridesmaids back from Westminster Abbey to Buckingham Palace after the wedding of the Duke and Duchess of Cambridge, 2011.

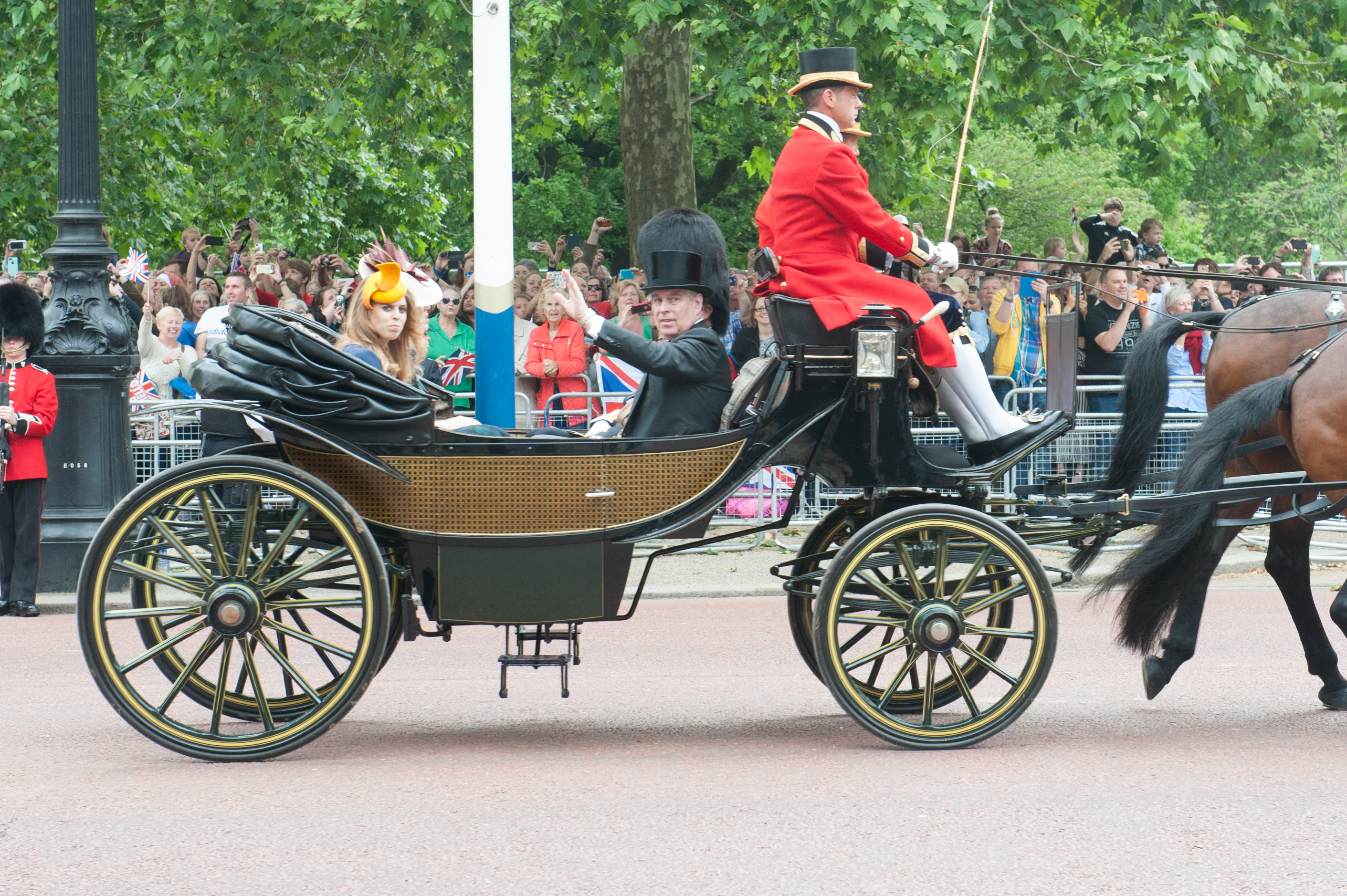
The "Balmoral" sociable in use for Trooping the Colour, 2016.

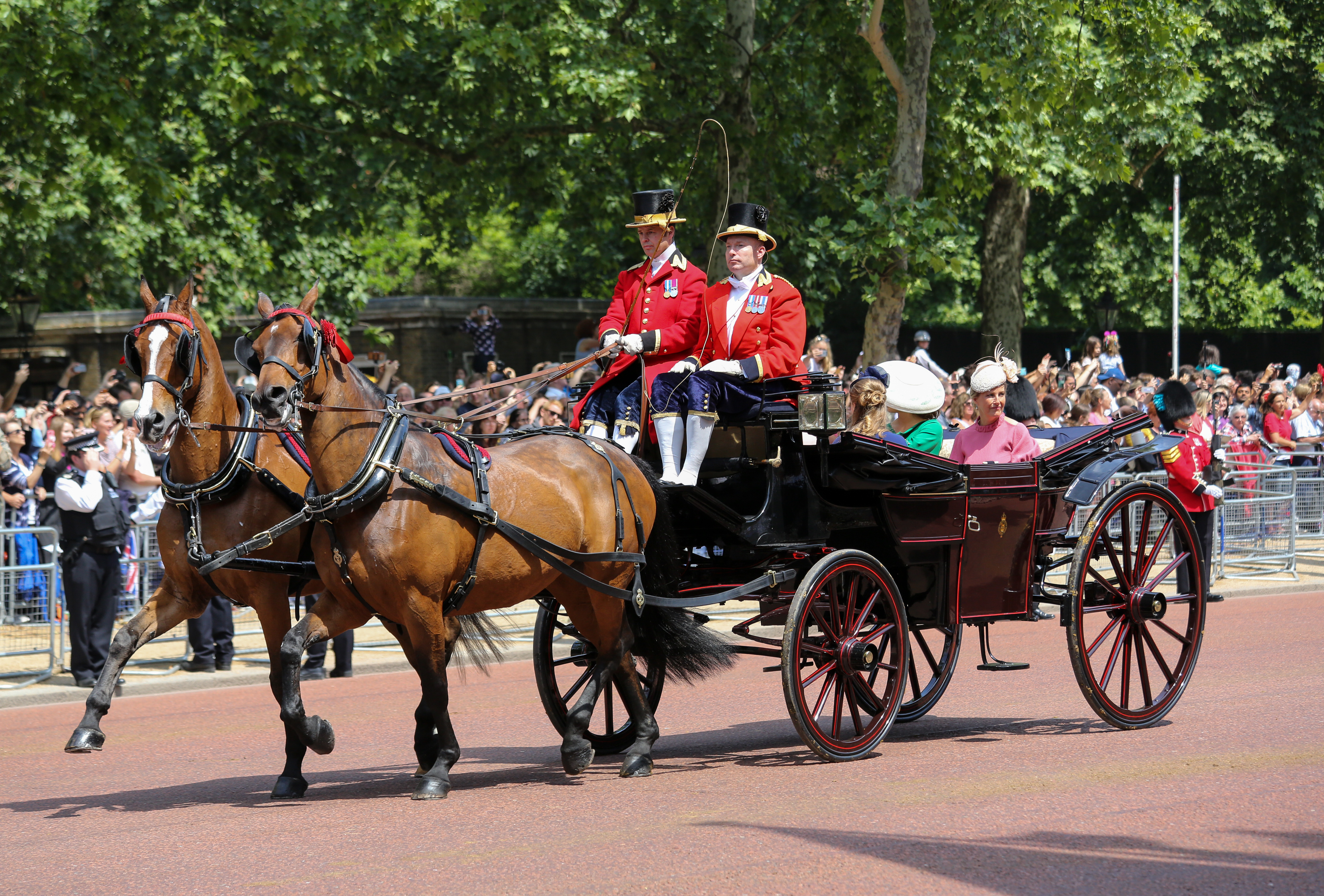
The "Balmoral" landau conveying the Countess of Wessex and others from Trooping the Colour, 2018.

== Motor vehicles ==
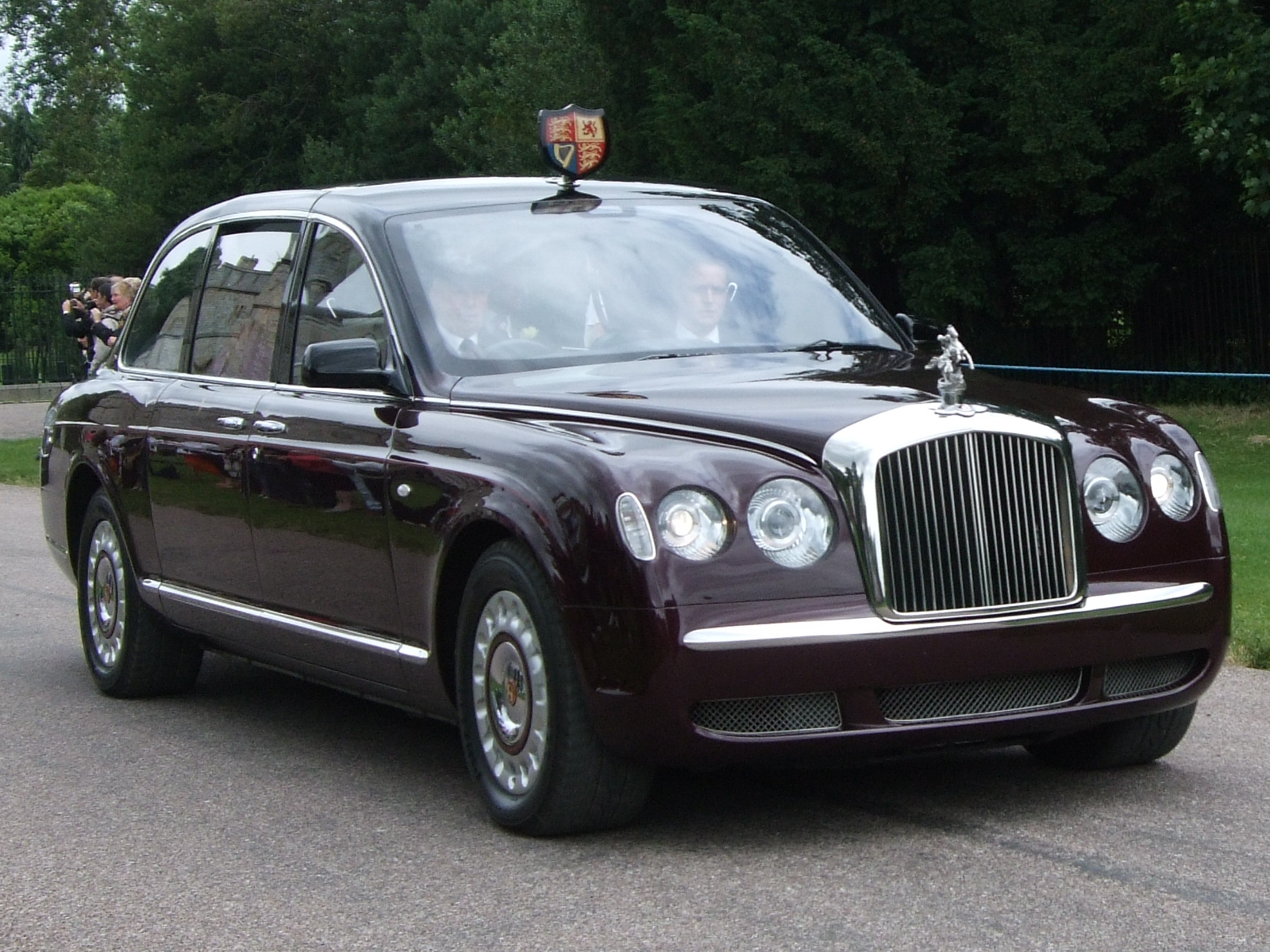
A 2002 Bentley State Limousine.

The maintenance and provision of modern motor vehicles is as much a part of the work of the Royal Mews as that of carriages and horses. Edward VII first established a garage in the Mews in the early years of the twentieth century.

The principal official cars are all painted in black over claret (known as Royal Claret). They are driven, cared for and maintained by a number of chauffeurs, who are based in the Mews and work under the head chauffeur (who, along with his deputy, is primarily responsible for driving the monarch).

=== State cars ===
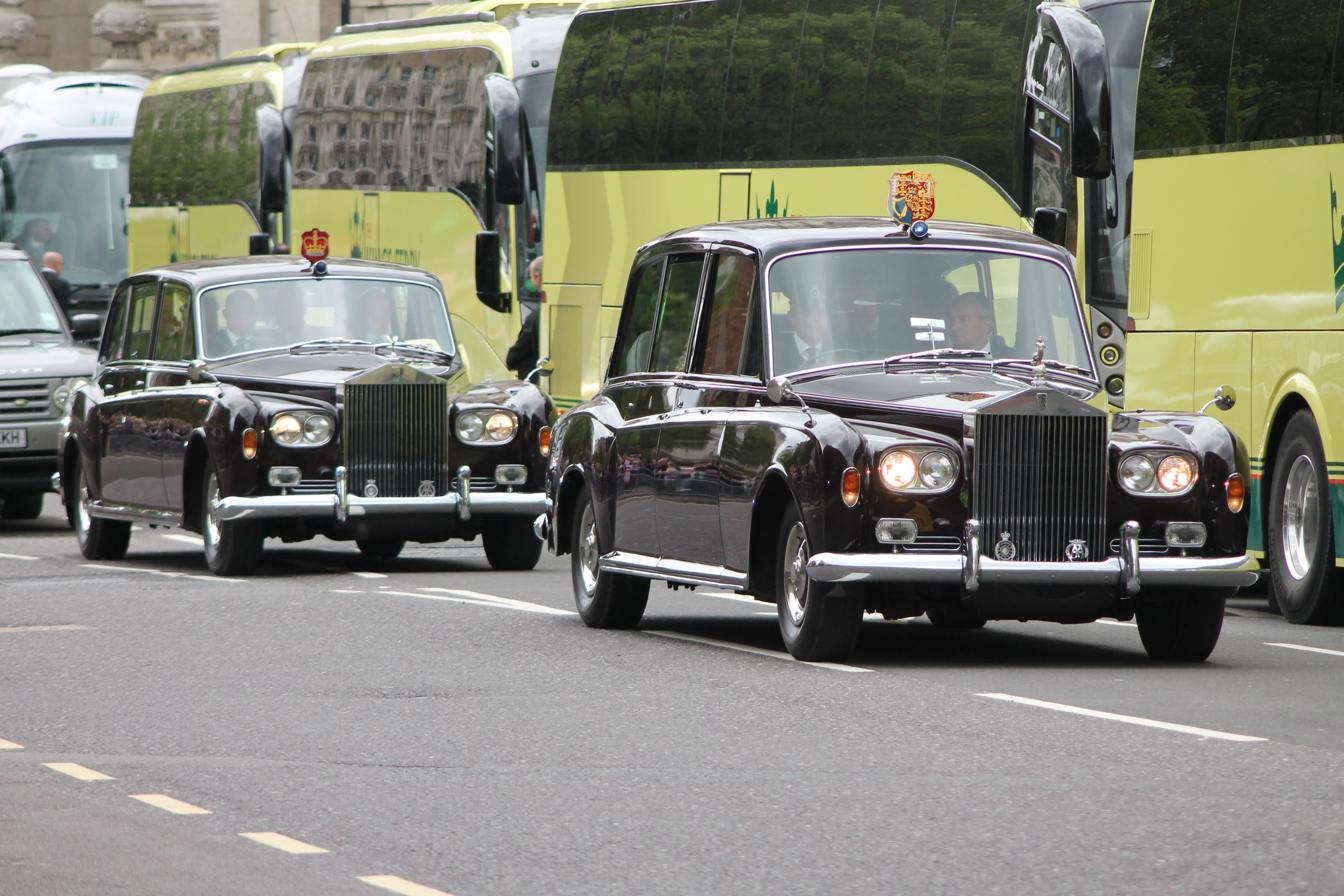
Rolls-Royce Phantom VI limousines from 1986 (left) and 1978 (right).

The five principal state cars are without number plates. They comprise:

- Two identical Bentley State Limousines (one was given to Queen Elizabeth II in 2002 to mark her Golden Jubilee, the other was purchased at the same time).
- Two Rolls-Royce Phantom VI limousines: the 1978 Silver Jubilee Phantom VI and a 1986 Phantom VI, both nearly identical outwardly, save for the slightly higher roof on the 1978 example (see photo).
- A rare 1950 Rolls-Royce Phantom IV with body by HJ Mulliner & Co., the first example of this model built; it was fitted with an automatic gearbox in 1955.

=== Other official vehicles ===
The following vehicles, used for less-formal occasions and as support vehicles, are similarly painted in the royal claret and black livery:

- Three Daimler DS420 limousines, two dating from 1992 (number plates KLL1 and K326EHV) and one from 1988 (F728OUL).
- Two 2012 Jaguar XJ limousines (number plates NGN 1 and NGN 2).
- Three 2022 Range Rovers (number plates MYT1, MYT 2 and MYT 3).
- The State Hearse commissioned for the funeral of Elizabeth II.

Land Rovers, luggage brakes and people carriers are also kept at the Royal Mews. A number of electric vehicles have been acquired since 2012, for various purposes, ranging from a BMW i3 and a BMW 7 Series hybrid to a Nissan van and a Renault Twizy.

Cars on display at the Royal Mews
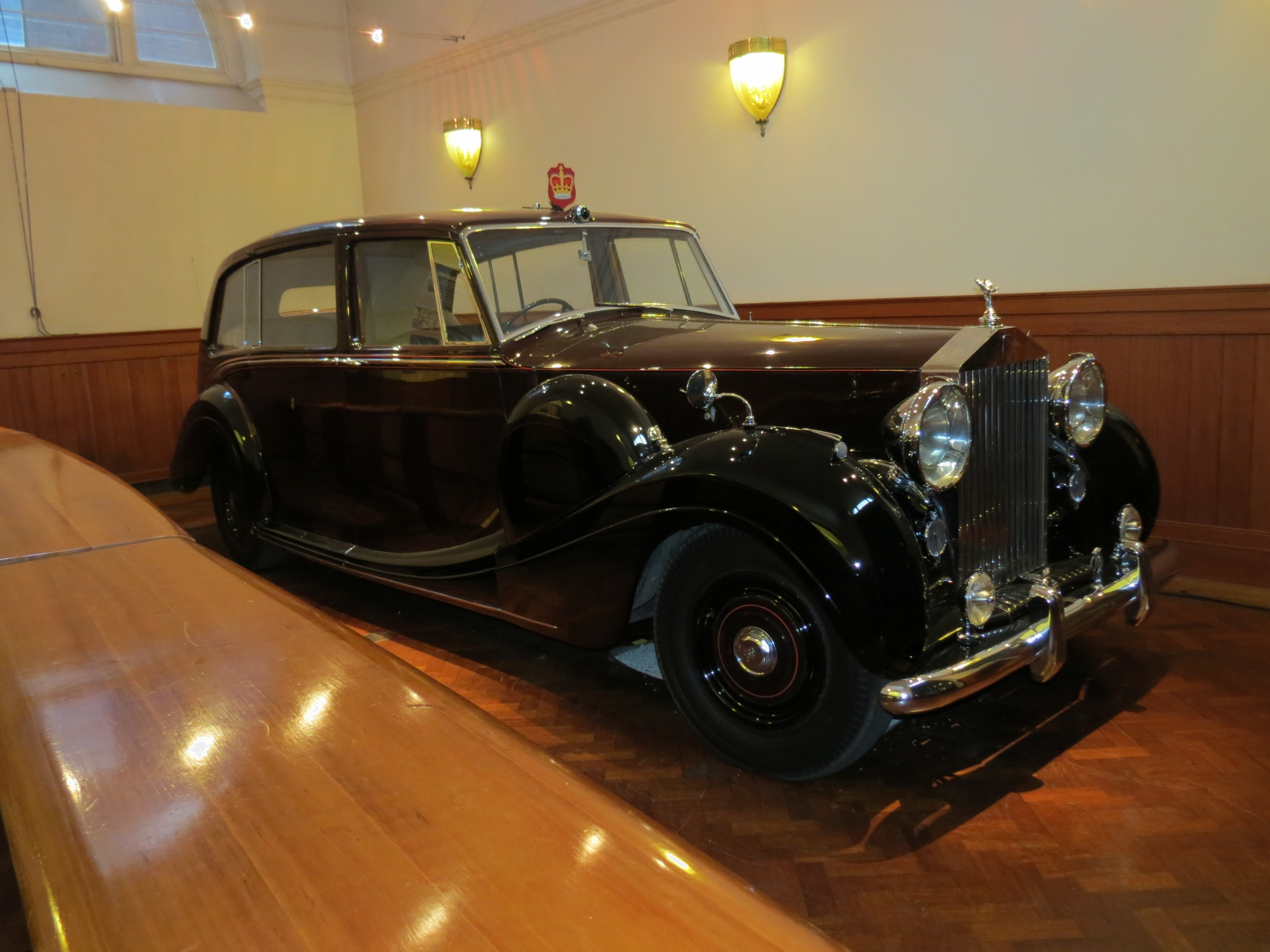
1950 Rolls-Royce Phantom IV limousine

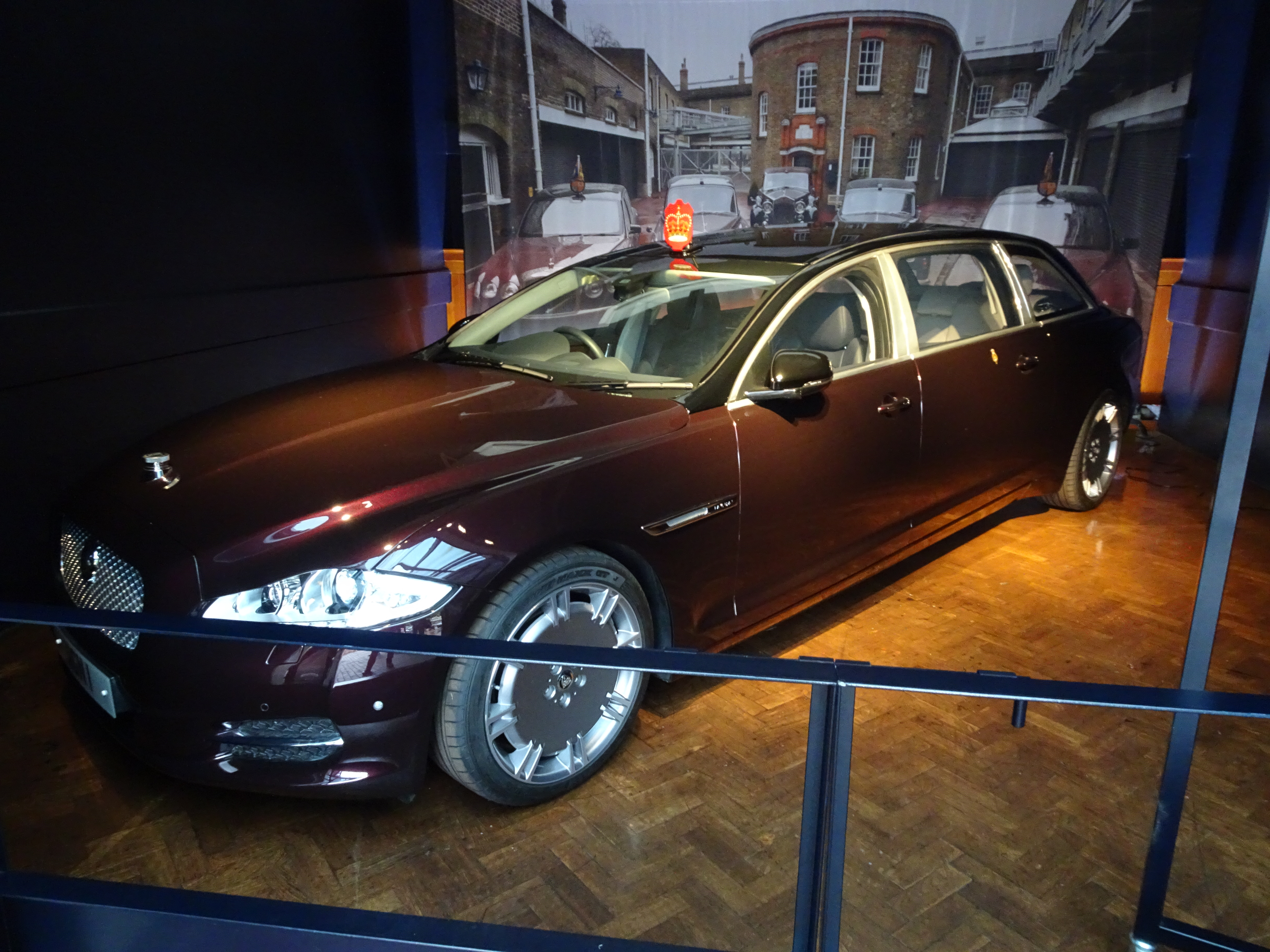
2012 Jaguar XJ limousine

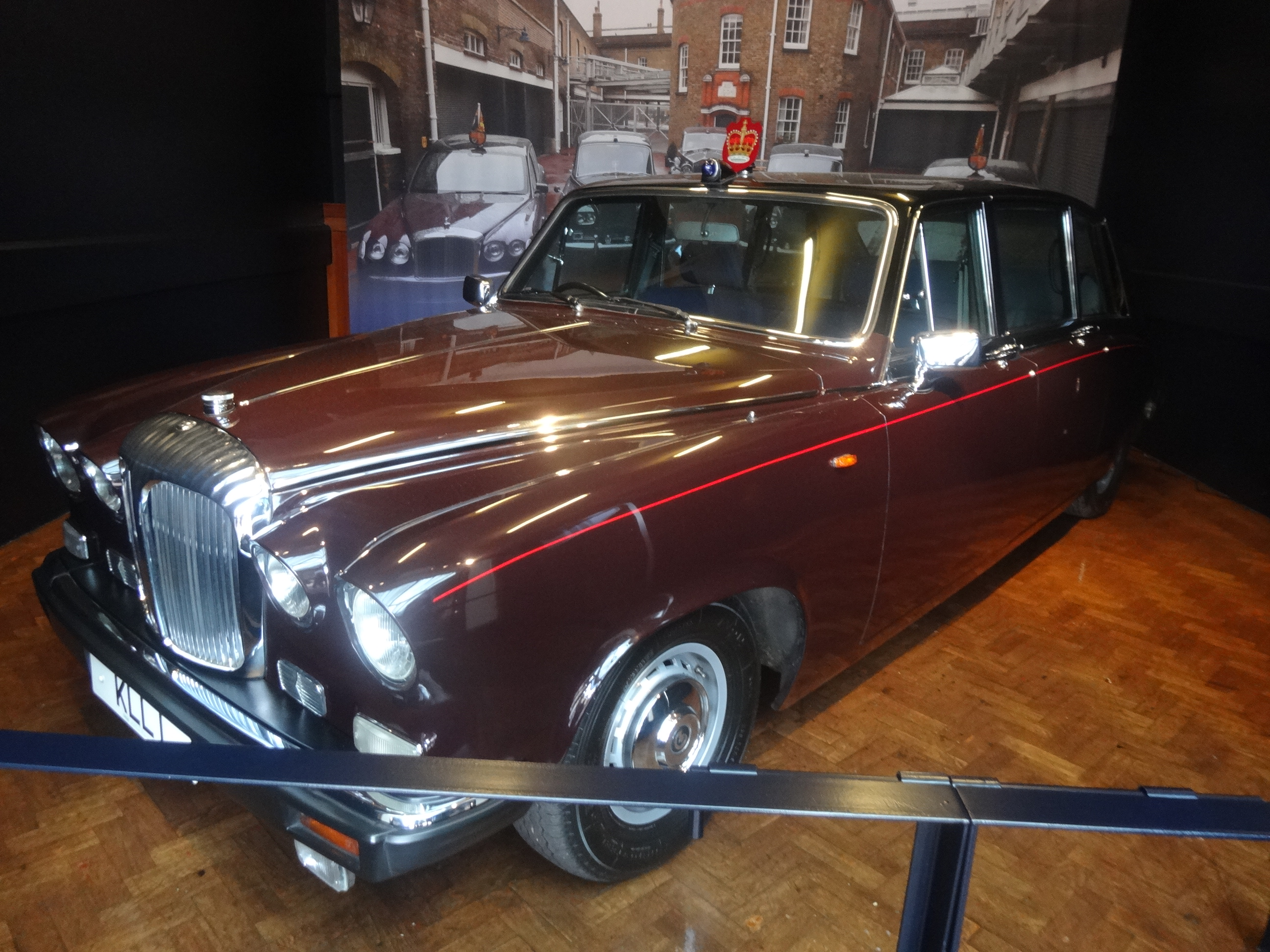
Daimler DS420 limousine

== The Royal Mews Department ==
The following chart shows the staff structure of the Royal Mews Department at the end of the twentieth century (when around fifty people lived and worked at the Mews). The position of Superintendent, which included oversight of the staff of the Mews, was abolished in 2000.

Crown Equerry
Superintendent of the Royal Mews
Veterinary; Surgeon	Horsebox Driver of Windsor	Stud Groom of Hampton Court	Stud Groom of Windsor	Comptroller of Stores	Chief Clerk
Storeman	Carriage; Restorers	Daily Ladies of London	Daily Ladies of Windsor	Deputy; Chief Clerk
Head Chauffeur	Head Coachman	Assistant; Chief Clerk
Deputy; Head Chauffeur	Deputy; Head Coachman
First Chauffeurs	Sergeant Farrier	Rough Rider	Senior; Liveried Helpers	Carriage Cleaners	Yardmen
Second Chauffeurs	Liveried Helpers

== See also ==
- Japan state carriages
- Royal Stables (Denmark)
- Royal Stables (Sweden)
- Royal Stables (Netherlands)
