= Sociable (carriage) =

Horse drawn carriage

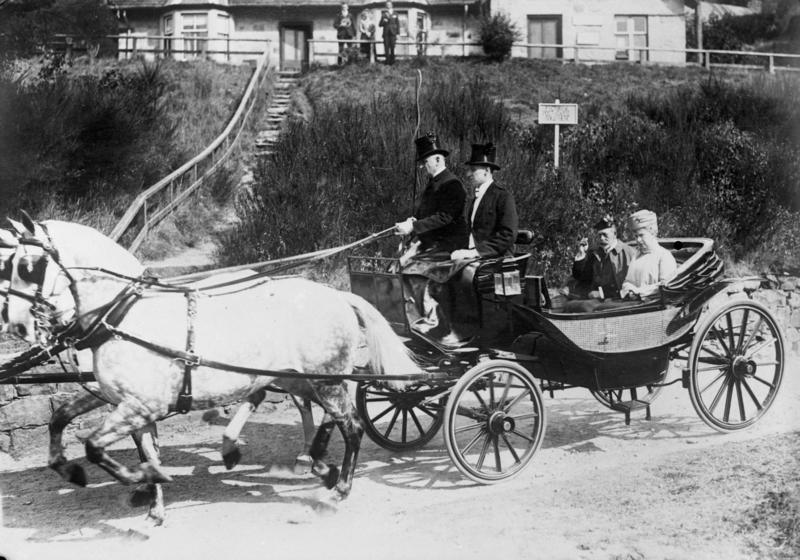
King George V and Queen Mary riding in the 'Balmoral' Sociable, July 1930.

A sociable is an open four-wheeled carriage with face-to-face seating and folding hoods, used primarily as a light town or pleasure vehicle. The term originated in the 18th century and was applied to a variety of related forms as carriage design evolved, ranging from early phaeton-like bodies to later combinations of the Barouche and Victoria. Despite these variations, sociables share a common layout of face-to-face seating in an open body mounted on a light undercarriage.

== Design and variations ==
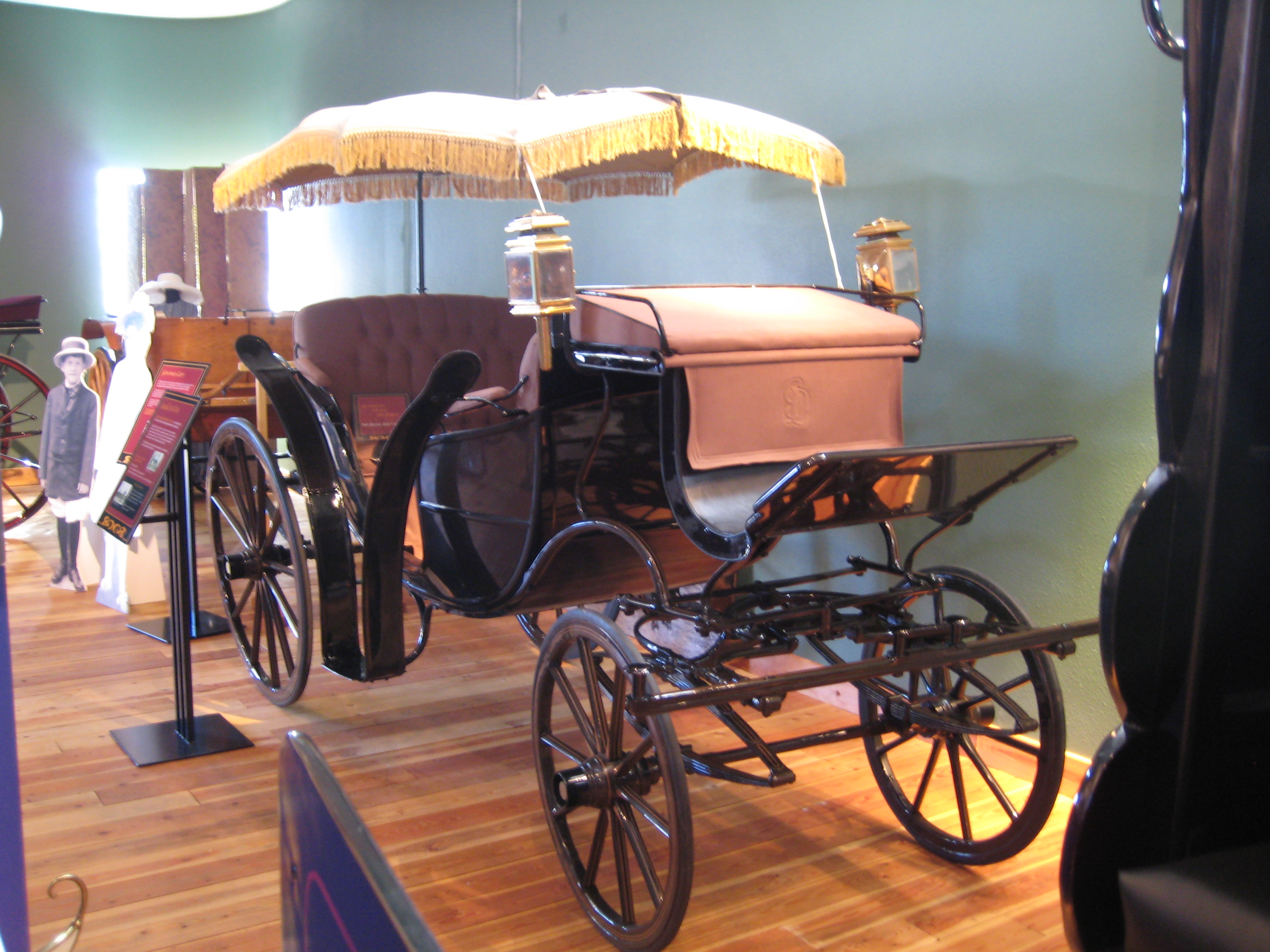
Sociable in US carriage museum, 2009

The sociable is an open four-wheeled town or pleasure carriage with two crosswise seats arranged face-to-face and protected by one or two folding hoods. The body is light and usually mounted on elliptic springs, with a small doorway and a single step for entry. Sociables usually have a low coachman's seat. They are typically drawn by a matching pair of horses in pole harness. Although the name was applied to several related carriage forms, the essential features of the sociable are its face-to-face seating, open body with a folding hood, and a light undercarriage suited to town or park use.

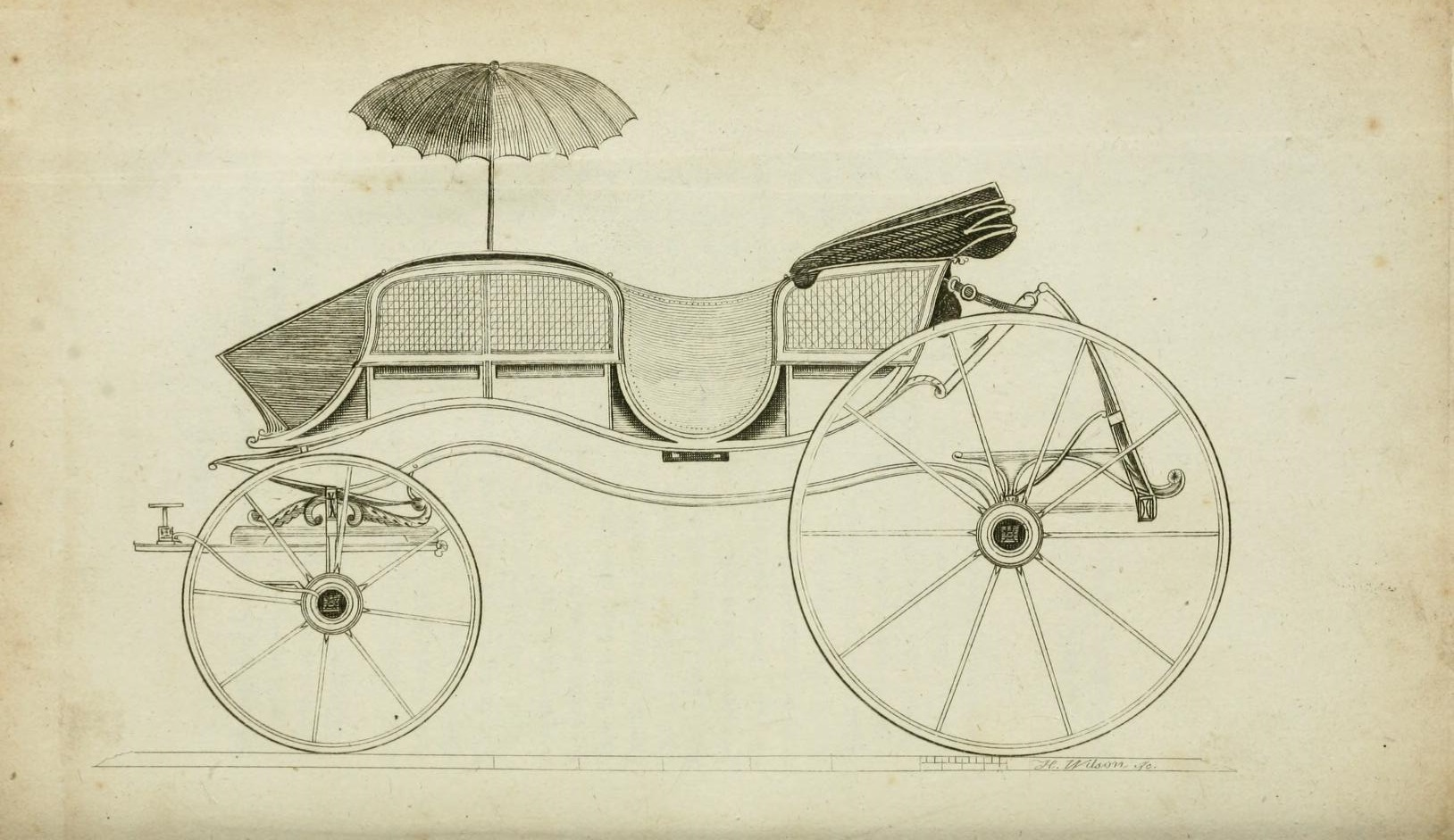
Sociable carriage, 1796

An early design in Felton (1796) shows a phaeton-like body, folding hood in the rear, and a mounted umbrella protecting the driver's seat and the front passenger seat. Felton describes making sociable bodies able to be mounted on coach undercarriages for families that only occasionally want to use one without paying the extra costs and taxes by purchasing an entire carriage.

The barouche sociable is a barouche with a double hood or two half-hoods, resembling two cabriolet bodies facing one another. It is hung higher than the sociable, with a light iron-framed driver's seat and four long fenders over the wheels.

The double victoria, introduced in 1885, is a combination of a Victoria and a sociable, sometimes called a "sociable without doors". The difference being that a double victoria has a permanent front seat for face-to-face seating, rather than a fold-down auxiliary seat or none at all, as in the Victoria.

The landau sociable or square town sociable is an angular sociable with a dropped cener.

== Historical context ==
According to Sir Walter Gilbey's 1905 book, the original sociable was an angular child's carriage around 1700. In the early 1800s, the sociable was a double-cab body (face to face seating with two folding hoods). By 1900, it was a low carriage with a small doorway, face to face seating for four, a low coachman's seat, and a folding hood for the rear.

In America, by the late 1800s, the sociable became known as a vis-à-vis. Walrond states that the term vis-à-vis became used for "any carriage of questionable identity, providing that the passengers sit face-to-face", Berkebile writes that the term "sociable" was gradually supplanted by "vis-à-vis", whereas Smith in 1974 opines that the use of "vis-à-vis" for anything other than the original narrow carriage of two single seats facing each other is "wrongly used".

Unrelated to the sociable carriage, around 1829 there was an early public service omnibus in New York called a "sociable". It had a rear entrance and longitudinal seats.

== Modern usage ==
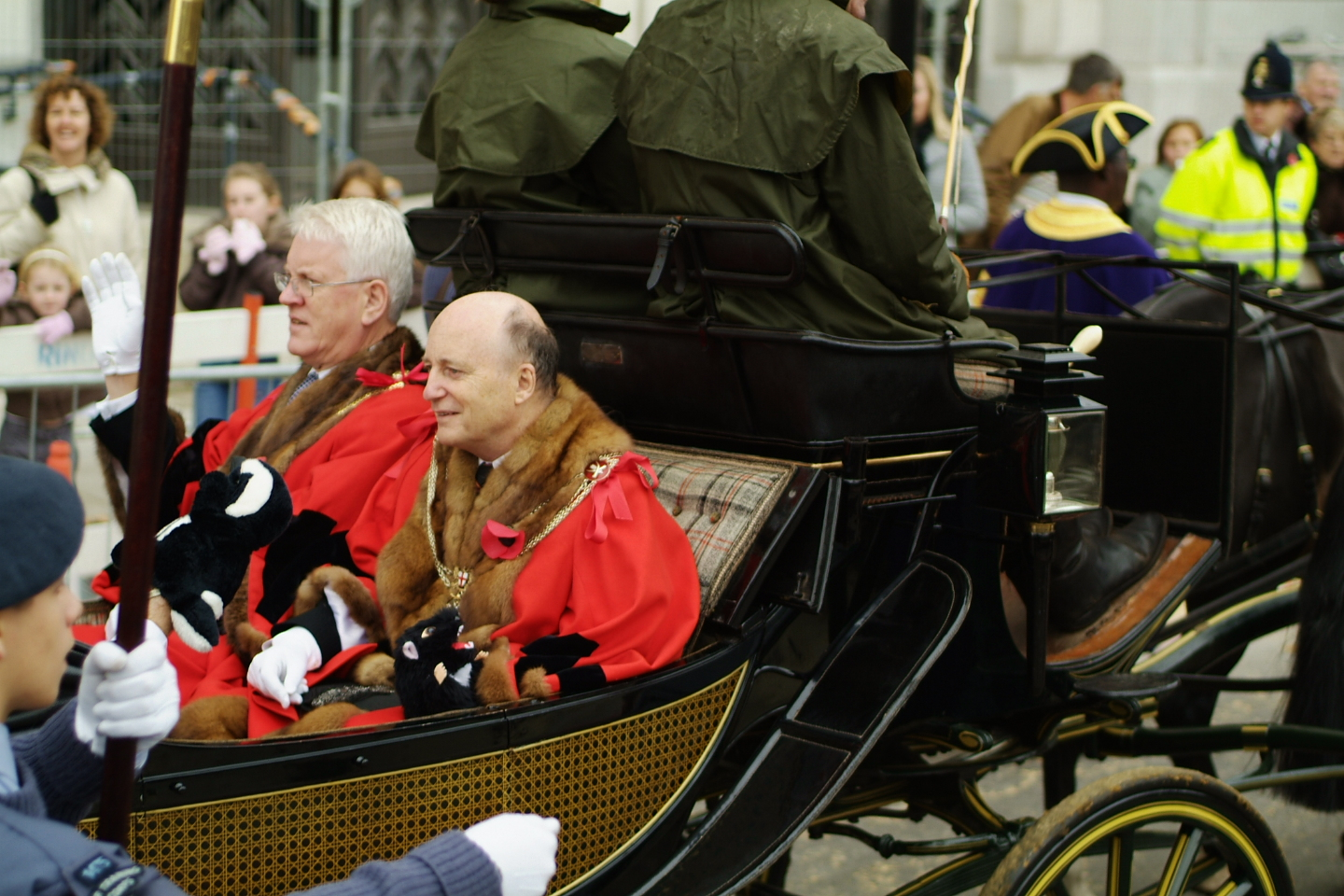
The Balmoral Sociable at the 2006 Lord Mayor's Show

The Balmoral Sociable is the name of a carriage in the Royal Mews, built by Cook and Holdway of London in the mid-1800s. It is a cross between a barouche and a Victoria, and is upholstered with Balmoral tartan. It was kept at Balmoral Castle and used often by Queen Victoria and King George V. In the 1960s it was used for a state visit, and was also seen at the Royal Show. It has been seen in Lord Mayor's Show processions. The 2008 wedding of Peter Phillips to Autumn Kelly included a ride in the Balmoral Sociable.

== See also ==
- Carriage
- Horse-drawn vehicle
- History of horse-drawn transport
