= Cotillion Coach =

Danish royal miniature ceremonial coach

- Kotillonvogn (Danish)
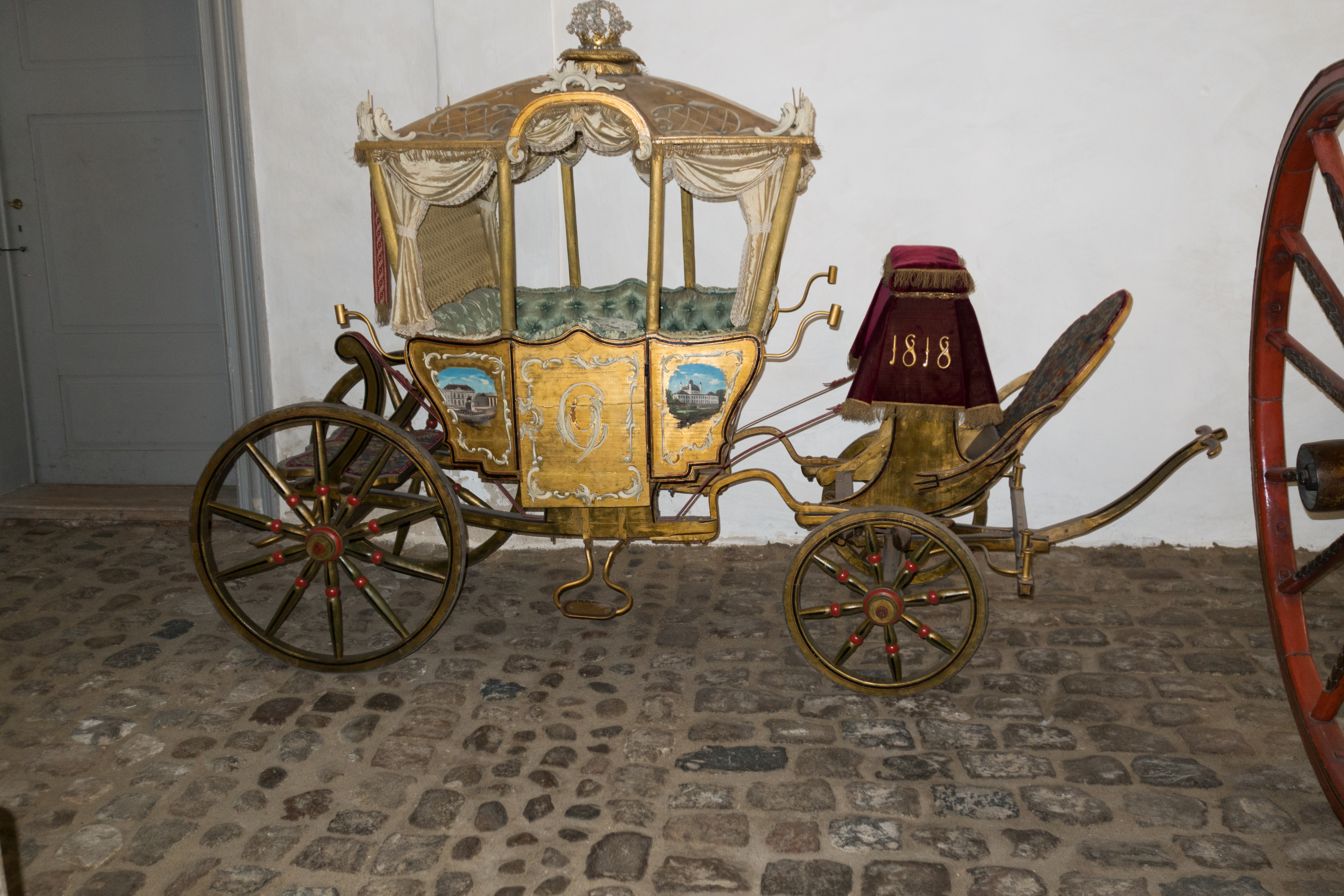
- Artist: Ernst Bojesen (coachbuilder)
- Completion date: 1888
- Type: Gilded Rococo-style miniature ceremonial carriage
- Condition: Preserved; restored for later royal events
- Location: The Royal Stables Museum, Copenhagen
- Owner: The Danish Royal Family

The Cotillion Coach (Danish: Kotillonvognen) is a miniature coach constructed in 1888 for the celebration of the 70th birthday of Christian IX of Denmark. It was later refurbished for the celebrations of the 18th birthday of Margrethe II and once again used at the 70th birthday of Queen Ingrid. It is on display in the Royal Stables and Carriage Museum at Christiansborg Palace in Copenhagen.

== Description ==
Built in the Rococo-style, this small ceremonial coach was constructed in an earlier style for royal coaches. The exterior is gilded and ornamented, with golden crowns mounted on the roof. There are several painted panels on the sides and rear that depict several palaces of the period, including Gottorf Castle, the Yellow Palace, Bernstorff Palace, the Amalienborg residence, and Fredensborg Palace. The coachman's seat is covered with a hammercloth of red velvet embroidered with the years 1818 and 1888, and the doors bear the gilded monogram of Christian IX. The interior is lined with blue brocade and fitted with pale yellow silk-crepe curtains.

This miniature coach is not drawn by horses, but by people. During its original use, the carriage was accompanied by costumed attendants including a coachman and two footmen, and was drawn by six children. The coach holds one seated occupant, originally the child portraying the "Elf Queen".

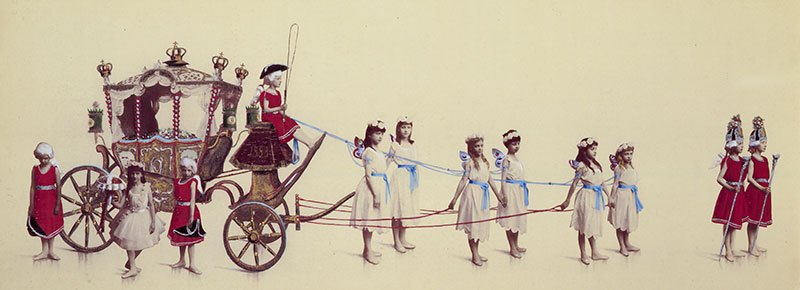
The Cotillion Coach at Christian IX's birthday ball

== History ==
The 70th birthday of Christian IX was celebrated with a ball attended by 700 guests at Amalienborg Palace. The entertainment after dinner comprised a cotillion in the Great Hall of Christian VII's mansion. As a surprise, it opened with a procession consisting of the specially manufactured miniature coach escorted by children dressed as elves, runners and lackeys. Inside the coach was a girl dressed as an "ambassadress from a distant country". Lord chamberlain Carl Løvenskiold, who had been responsible for the planning of the ball, had also fostered the idea of the tableau and arranged for the construction of the carriage.

The day after the ball, the newspaper Fredericia Dagblad provided a detailed account of the event:

After the supper, Their Majesties returned to Christian VII's Palace and went directly into the great hall, where the younger ladies and gentlemen also gathered, while the rest of the company dispersed into the adjoining rooms. It did not take long before everyone who could possibly gain access to the ballroom, or to the entrances leading to it, made their way there.

Procession with elves and the cotillion carriage The surprise of the evening was once again reserved for the tireless Overhofmarskal, who had prepared for Their Majesties – who, it was said, had not the slightest idea of the beautiful and highly charming form in which the cotillion was to begin on this festive evening. After Their Majesties had taken the seats reserved for them, the music announced the arrival of envoys from the Realm of the Elves, who on this occasion wished to bring Their Majesties a greeting.

Into the hall now came a festive procession, opened by two elves dressed in red gowns, wearing flower-adorned runner's hats on their heads (a faithful copy of the gala hats of the royal runners) and carrying heavy silver staffs in their hands. After them followed a richly gilded Rococo-style carriage, harnessed with red ribbons to six elves dressed in white, each with butterfly wings on their backs.

On the red velvet coachman's seat, which bore the years 1818 and 1888, sat a winged coachman in full gala costume, with a tricorne hat and curled peruke, proudly driving his six-in-hand with light blue silk reins. At the back of the carriage stood two stiff and upright elf footmen, and inside the carriage, enthroned in a sea of flowers, sat the little Elf Queen – the ambassadress from the distant land – wearing a rose-garlanded dress.

The carriage, made entirely in old-fashioned style, was richly gilded and ornamented, lined with blue brocade and fitted with pale yellow silk-crepe curtains. On its corners and across the top shone golden crowns. On the rear panel, on a gold background, was painted Gottorf Castle; on one side, the Yellow Palace in Amaliegade and Bernstorff Palace; on the other side, the Residence Palace at Amalienborg and Fredensborg Palace — a graceful reference to the palaces where His Majesty the King had been born and had spent his life. On the carriage doors, His Majesty's monogram appeared in gilded woodcarving.

The entire procession, which attracted universal attention and was admired as much for its originality as for the fully realized style with its baroque touches, was in perfect harmony with the richly decorated Rococo hall and was due solely to the invention of the Overhofmarskal.

After the procession had driven around the hall, the coachman halted the winged elves before Their Majesties. The footmen jumped down, opened the carriage door, and the Elf Queen sprang out as lightly as a feather. After presenting Their Majesties with a splendid bouquet, with the dignity and grace of a queen, she recited a short poem composed for the occasion – a greeting from the Realm of the Elves, where, in the radiance of light, they rejoiced over all the good that had been done through the many years by the noble King and the gracious Queen, and from where, on this day as well, blessings were foretold for future happiness in the pursuit of all that is beautiful, noble, and great.

The little ambassadress then stepped back into the carriage, and the procession continued to the center of the hall, after which the cotillion was danced until the carriage had been emptied of the rich abundance of flowers the elves had brought.

At half past two, Their Majesties and the other members of the Royal Family withdrew and left the reception rooms of Christian VII's Palace, returning the same way they had come to the Residence Palace. The company then dispersed and gradually left the palace.

The execution of the carriage and its accessories used at the ball had been arranged by the art dealer Ernst Bojesen, and the abundant floral decorations were supplied by Dina Schuldt & Co., Court Florists, both of whom were much praised for the way they had fulfilled the tasks entrusted to them.

— Fredericia Dagblad, 10 April 1888. Translated from the Danish.

== Modern use ==
In 1958, prior to the festivities in connection with the 18th birthday of Princess Margrethe on 15 April 1958, Frederik IX and Queen Ingrid had the cotillion coach refurbished. At the birthday party, it was drawn into the Knight's Hall of Frederick VIII's mansion with Princess Anne Marie sitting inside it with a wealth of cotillion coach bouquets.

In 1980, for the 70th birthday of Queen Ingrid on 28 March 1980, it was decorated with flowers by florist Erik Bering. It was his first official assignment for the royal family. The idea was fostered by Princess Benedikte and the coach was drawn into the Kuppelsalen at Fredensborg Palace during the dinner.

In 1989, at the celebration of the silver anniversary of Constantin and Anne Marie in a tent in the garden of Fredensborg Palace, their two youngest grandchildren, Princess Theodora and Prince Philippos, were given a ride in the coach which was decorated with flowers and drawn by coachmen Jens Christiansen and Erik Kofoed.

== 1906 Tivoli Gardens replica ==
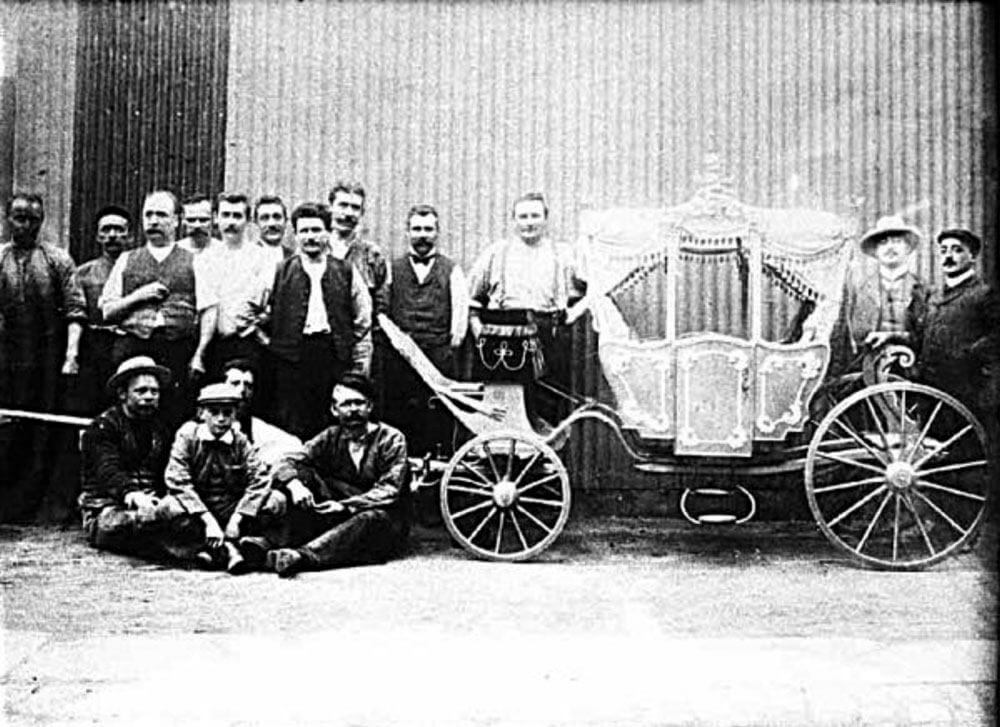
Tivoli's Gold Coach at P.M. Knudsens Barnevognsfabrik

In 1906, Tivoli Gardens created a replica of the Cotillion Coach for the Tivoli Guards. It was constructed at P.M. Knudsens Barnevognsfabrik on Frederiksberg. In 1965, it accompanied the Tivoli Guards on a visit to New York City in connection with the 1964–65 World's Fair. It was decommissioned in 2012.

== See also ==
- List of state coaches
- Golden Coupé (Denmark)
