= State coach =

Ceremonial carriage

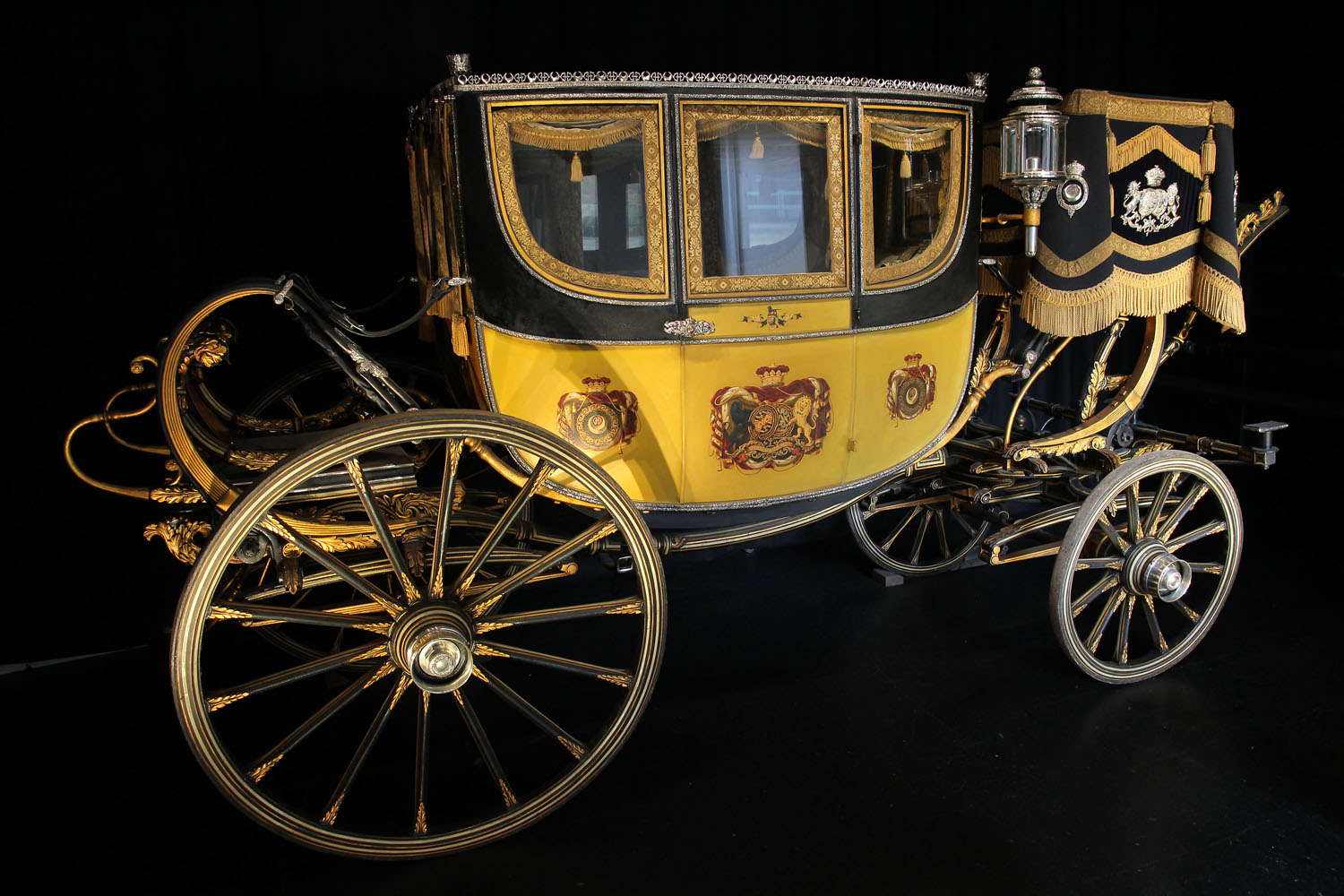
Northumberland State Coach (1826) for the Duke of Northumberland

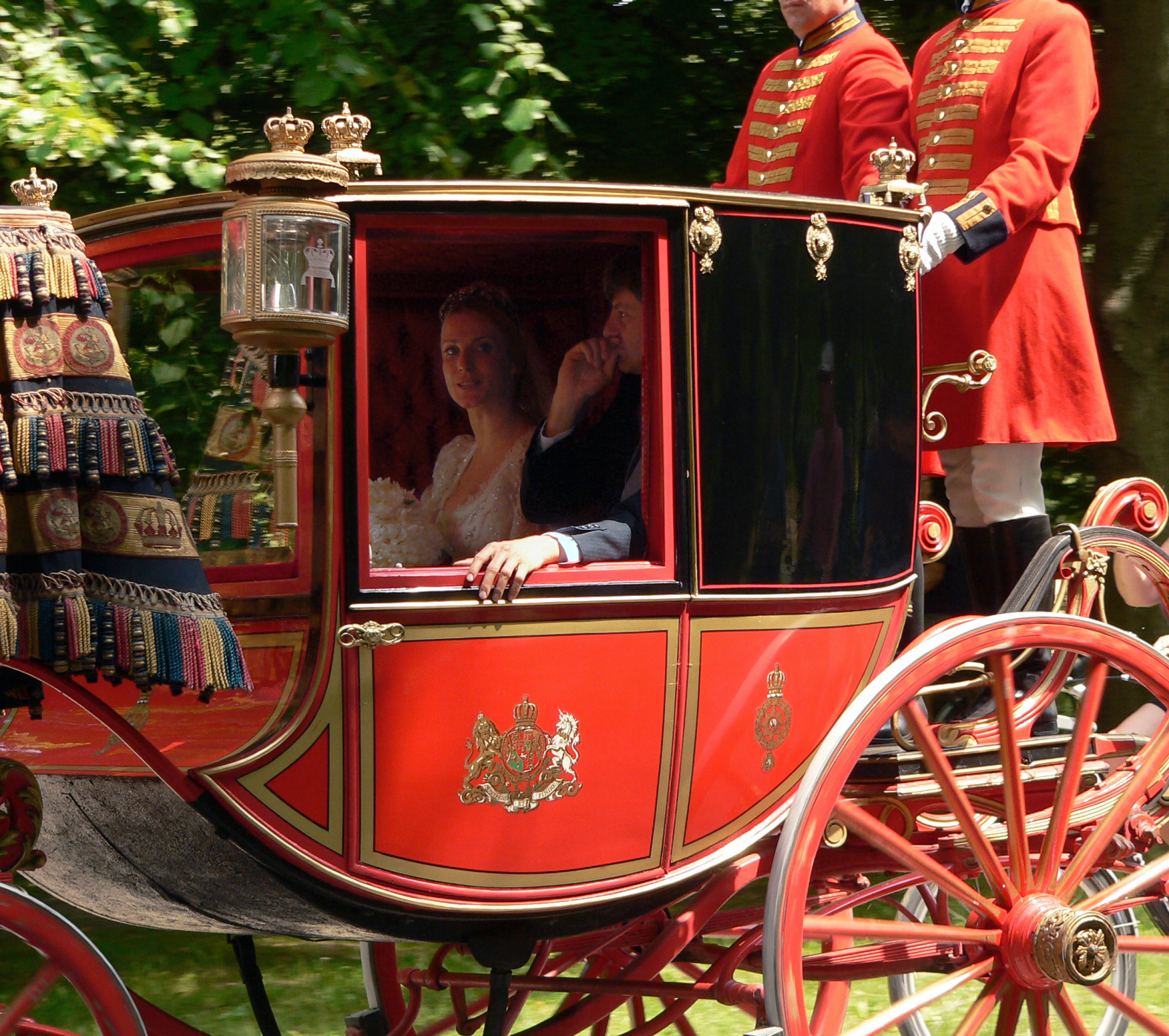
A state chariot from Hanover

A state coach, also known as a gala coach, is a highly decorative ceremonial coach used in Europe by a monarch or head of state on state occasions. A four-wheeled vehicle for four passengers, it may be drawn at a walk by six or more horses with postilions, or be driven by two or more horses. The term is also used to indicate a formal town coach used by nobility and the wealthy for formal occasions, drawn by a pair of matching horses.

A state chariot, also called a gala chariot or dress chariot, is an elaborately decorated four-wheeled vehicle for two passengers for ceremonial occasions; often the front panel is replaced by a glass panel or windscreen. The word chariot was used in England, and coupé in France.

== Overview ==
The first state coach was built in the mid-1500s by Walter Rippon for the State Opening of Parliament, and most had been built by 1840. State coaches are still used for royal weddings and other state ceremonial events.

State coaches were built by coachbuilders with excellent craftsmanship and the finest finishes. Most state coaches have large glass windows so passengers can be seen by spectators. The interiors are trimmed in silks and the exteriors decorated with elaborate paintings, figures, coats of arms, gilt-work, and hammercloths. The coachman and footmen wear state livery and the horses are harnessed with ornate state harness.

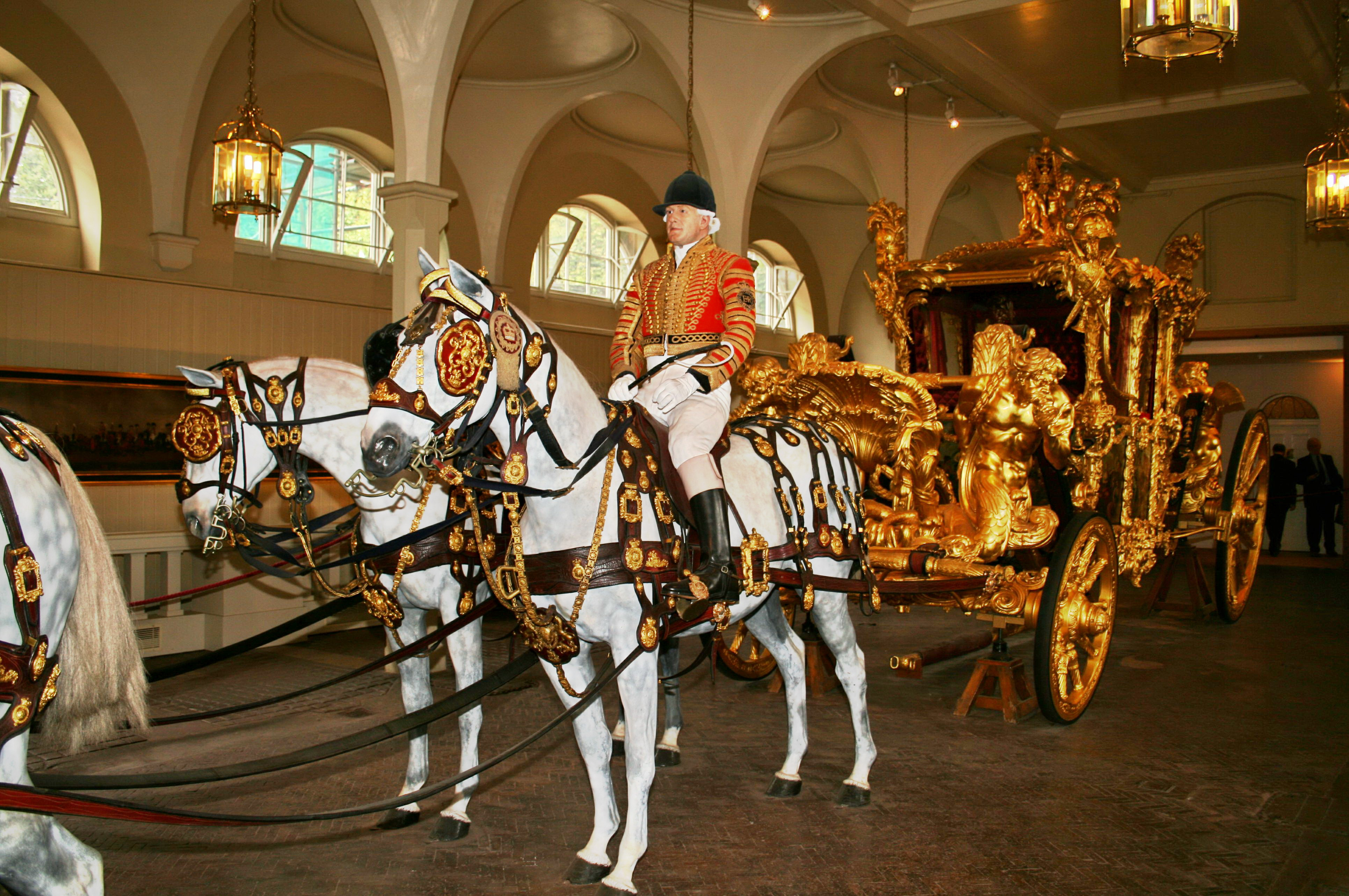
Typical grey coach horse, elaborate state harness and postilion rider wearing livery

The coachmen, footmen, and postilions on state coaches wore ornate livery to match the grandeur of the coaches themselves. ... dressed in appropriately ornate livery coats, richly embellished with gold cords and strappings, worn with silk knee breeches, silk stockings, buckled shoes, and a cocked hat.

— Thomas Ryder, Fashion on Wheels

Many state coaches were constructed to be convertible. They can be driven by a coachman from a driver's seat in the front, usually covered by an elaborate hammercloth, or the seat can be removed and the carriage is guided by postilion riders and outriders. A carriage arranged for postilion may have "à la Daumont" appended to its name. "Daumont" is a corruption of the French d'Aumont from the 8th Duke of Aumont who preferred this manner of travel.

Early state coaches in England were drawn by cream-colored horses of Hanoverian blood. In the early 1920s they were replaced by black horses. Now, teams of grey horses are used for the Sovereign, and bay horses are used for other passengers.

Another type of state coach is the cardinal's coach, which was painted red and used by cardinals.

== List of state coaches ==
| Image | Name | Built (Note: Dates may be approximate, since some of the coaches took many years to complete, and others have scant records) | State (Note: 'State' is current owning nation-state; historical other countries may be listed under 'Notes') | Location | Notes |
|---|---|---|---|---|---|
| | Bridal Coach | 1560-1561 | Germany | Veste Coburg; Coburg | Golden bridal coach of Dorothea of Denmark reused for the 1599 wedding of her daughter Margaret with Duke John Casimir |
| | Bridal Coach | 1586 | Germany | Veste Coburg; Coburg | Golden bridal coach built for the 1586 wedding of Anna of Saxony with Duke John Casimir |
| | Golden Coach for the Imperial Embassy to Pope Urban VIII | 1638 | Czech Republic | Český Krumlov Castle; Český Krumlov | Built in Rome for Johan Anton I von Eggenberg, Imperial ambassador to the Holy See |
| | State Coach of Maria Francisca of Savoy, Queen of Portugal | 1666 | Portugal | National Coach Museum; Lisbon | Brought from France by Maria Francisca of Savoy on the occasion of her wedding to Peter II of Portugal |
| | Carroza Negra | 1670-1680 | Spain | Royal Collections Gallery; Madrid | Belonged to Mariana of Austria |
| | Swedish Coronation Coach | 1696-1699, 1751 | Sweden | Livrustkammaren; Stockholm | Built in Paris for Charles XI, refurbished in 1751 |
| | Speaker's State Coach | 1698 | United Kingdom | Palace of Westminster; London | Built for William III |
| | State Coach of Maria Anna of Austria, Queen of Portugal | 1708 | Portugal | National Coach Museum; Lisbon | Given by the Holy Roman Emperor to his sister Maria Anna of Austria on the occasion of her marriage to John V of Portugal |
| | State Coach of the Oceans | 1716 | Portugal | National Coach Museum; Lisbon | Built in Rome for the Portuguese ambassador to the Holy See |
| | State Coach of the Coronation of Lisbon | 1716 | Portugal | National Coach Museum; Lisbon | Built in Rome for the Portuguese ambassador to the Holy See |
| | State Coach of the Ambassador | 1716 | Portugal | National Coach Museum; Lisbon | Built in Rome for the Portuguese ambassador to the Holy See |
| | State Coach of King John V | 1720 (c.) | Portugal | National Coach Museum; Lisbon | Built in Portugal for John V of Portugal |
| | Imperial Coach; Imperialwagen | 1735 | Austria | Imperial Carriage Museum; Vienna | Built for Charles VI |
| | Golden Coach; Goldene Kutsche | 1738 | Austria | Liechtenstein Garden Palace; Vienna | Built in Paris for Joseph Wenzel I, Prince of Liechtenstein |
| | Coronation coach of Emperor Charles VII | 1742 | Germany | Marstallmuseum Nymphenburg; Munich | Built for Charles VII |
| | Lord Mayor of London's State Coach | 1757 | United Kingdom | Museum of London; London | Built by Joseph Berry |
| | Gold State Coach | 1762 | United Kingdom | Royal Mews; London | Built for George III |
| | Crown Prince's State Coach | 1763–68 | Sweden | Livrustkammaren; Stockholm | Built for crown prince Gustav |
| | Queen's Brussels State Coach | 1780 (c.) | Sweden | Livrustkammaren; Stockholm | Built by Simons in Brussels for Queen Sophia Magdalena of Sweden |
| | Lord Mayor of Dublin's State Coach | 1789 | Ireland | Mansion House; Dublin | Restored in 1975. In use for St. Patrick's Day parade and Dublin Horse Show. |
| | Coronation coach of King Maximilian I Joseph | 1806 | Germany | Marstallmuseum Nymphenburg; Munich | Built for Maximilian I Joseph |
| | Egiziana State Coach | 1819 | Italy | Quirinal Palace; Rome | Built in Turin after designs by Giacomo Pregliasco for Charles Felix of Sardinia |
| | State Coach for the Baptism of the Duke of Bordeaux | 1821 | France | Galerie des Carrosses; Versailles | Built for the Baptism of the Duke of Bordeaux, redecorated 1852-53 for the wedding of Napoleon III |
| | Crown State Coach | 1824 | Portugal | National Coach Museum; Lisbon | Built in London for John VI |
| | Coronation Coach of Charles X | 1825 | France | Galerie des Carrosses; Versailles | Completed for the coronation of Charles X of France |
| | Gran Gala Berlin State Coach of Pope Leo XII | 1826 | Vatican City | Carriage Pavilion at the Vatican Museums; Vatican City | Built for Pope Leo XII, altered for Pope Gregory XVI |
| | Glass Coach | 1826 | Netherlands | Royal Stables; The Hague | Built by Simons in Brussels for William I |
| | State Coach of the Royal Crown | 1829-33 | Spain | Royal Collections Gallery; Madrid | Built in Madrid by Julián González for Ferdinand VII |
| | Scottish State Coach | 1830 | United Kingdom | Royal Mews; London | Built for Prince Adolphus |
| | Golden Coupé | 1840 | Denmark | Royal Mews and Carriage Museum, Christiansborg Palace; Copenhagen | Built for Christian VIII |
| | Coronation Coach of Pedro II of Brazil | 1841 | Brazil | Imperial Museum of Brazil; Petrópolis | Built in London for the coronation of Emperor Pedro II of Brazil |
| | Irish State Coach | 1851 | United Kingdom | Royal Mews; London | Built by Thomas Hutton, and later purchased by Queen Victoria. Replicated by Barkers in 1911 when it was destroyed by fire at their shop |
| | Napoleon III State Coach | 1852 | Belgium | Art & History Museum exhibited at Autoworld; Brussels | Built by Ehrler in Paris for Napoleon III Used at the Baptism of Louis-Napoléon, Prince Imperial |
| | State Coach 'Louise-Marie' | 1855 (c.) | Belgium | Art & History Museum exhibited at the Palace of Laeken; Brussels | Built by Jones Frères in Brussels for King Leopold I of Belgium |
| | Coronation Coach of Alexander II | 1856 | Russia | Tsarskoye Selo State Museum; Saint Petersburg | Built by Christian Tatzki in St. Petersburg for the coronation of Alexander II of Russia |
| | Emperor Maximilian's State Coach | 1864 | Mexico | Chapultepec Castle; Mexico City | Built by Cesare Scala in Milan for Maximilian I of Mexico |
| | Emperor Franz Joseph's State Coach | 1865 | Austria | Imperial Carriage Museum; Vienna | Built by Carl Marius for Emperor Franz Joseph I of Austria |
| | Queen Alexandra's State Coach | 1865 | United Kingdom | Royal Mews; London | Built as a town coach, later converted to a state coach for Queen Alexandra |
| | New dress coach of Ludwig II | 1870 | Germany | Marstallmuseum Nymphenburg; Munich | Built for Ludwig II of Bavaria |
| | Glass Coach | 1881 | United Kingdom | Royal Mews; London | Purchased by the Crown for the coronation of George V and Mary in 1911 |
| | Cotillion Coach | 1888 | Denmark | Royal Mews and Carriage Museum, Christiansborg Palace; Copenhagen | Miniature coach for Christian IX |
| | Gran Carroza de Gala | 1890 (c.) | Chile | Museo del Carmen de Maipú; Santiago | Barouche built by Paris coachbuilder Million-Guiet for Chile president José Manuel Balmaceda |
| | State Coach of the French Republic | 1896 | France | National Car and Tourism Museum, Compiègne | Built for the French President on the occasion of the State visit of Czar Nicholas II |
| | Sjuglas State Carriage | 1897 | Sweden | Royal Stables; Stockholm | Built by Ad. Freyschuss Hofvagnfabrik to celebrate King Oscar II’s 25th anniversary on the throne in 1897 |
| | Golden Coach | 1898 | Netherlands | Royal Stables; The Hague | Built by Spyker as a gift from the people of Amsterdam to Queen Wilhelmina |
| | Creme Calèche | 1898 | Netherlands | Royal Stables; The Hague | Built by Hermans & Co in The Hague for Queen Emma as a gift to her daughter Queen Wilhelmina |
| | State Landau | 1902 | United Kingdom | Royal Mews; London | Built by Hooper for Edward VII; drawn by 6 grey horses with three postilion riders |
| | Imperial Carriage No.1 | 1914 | Japan | Imperial Household Agency; Tokyo | Reserved for the Emperor of Japan, it has only been used for the enthronement ceremonies of Emperor Taishō and Emperor Shōwa. |
| | Australian State Coach | 1988 | United Kingdom | Royal Mews; London | Built for Elizabeth II |
| | Diamond Jubilee State Coach | 2010 | United Kingdom | Royal Mews; London | Built for Elizabeth II |

== Gallery ==
A sampling of early state coaches and chariots

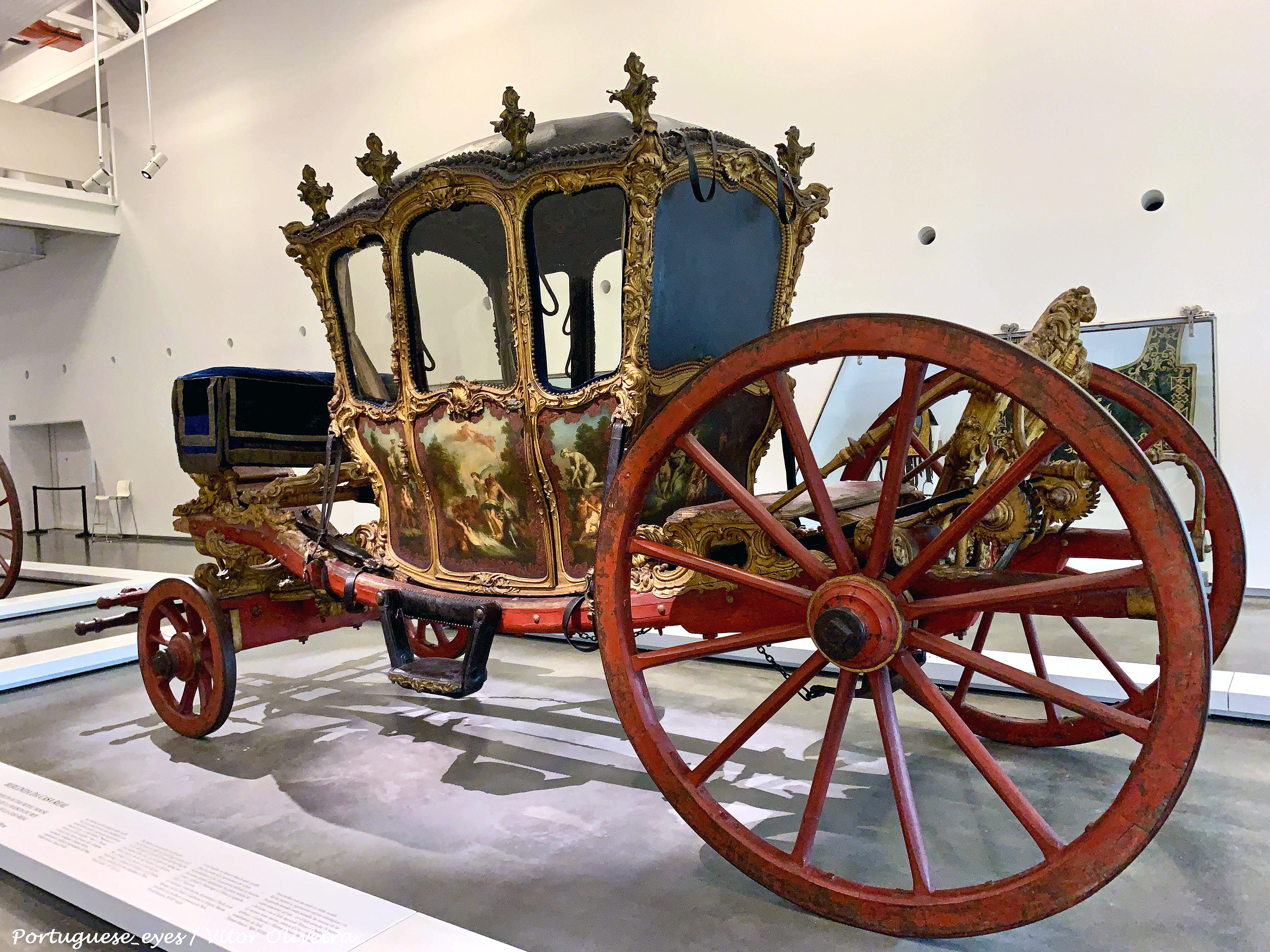
18th century Berlin from France

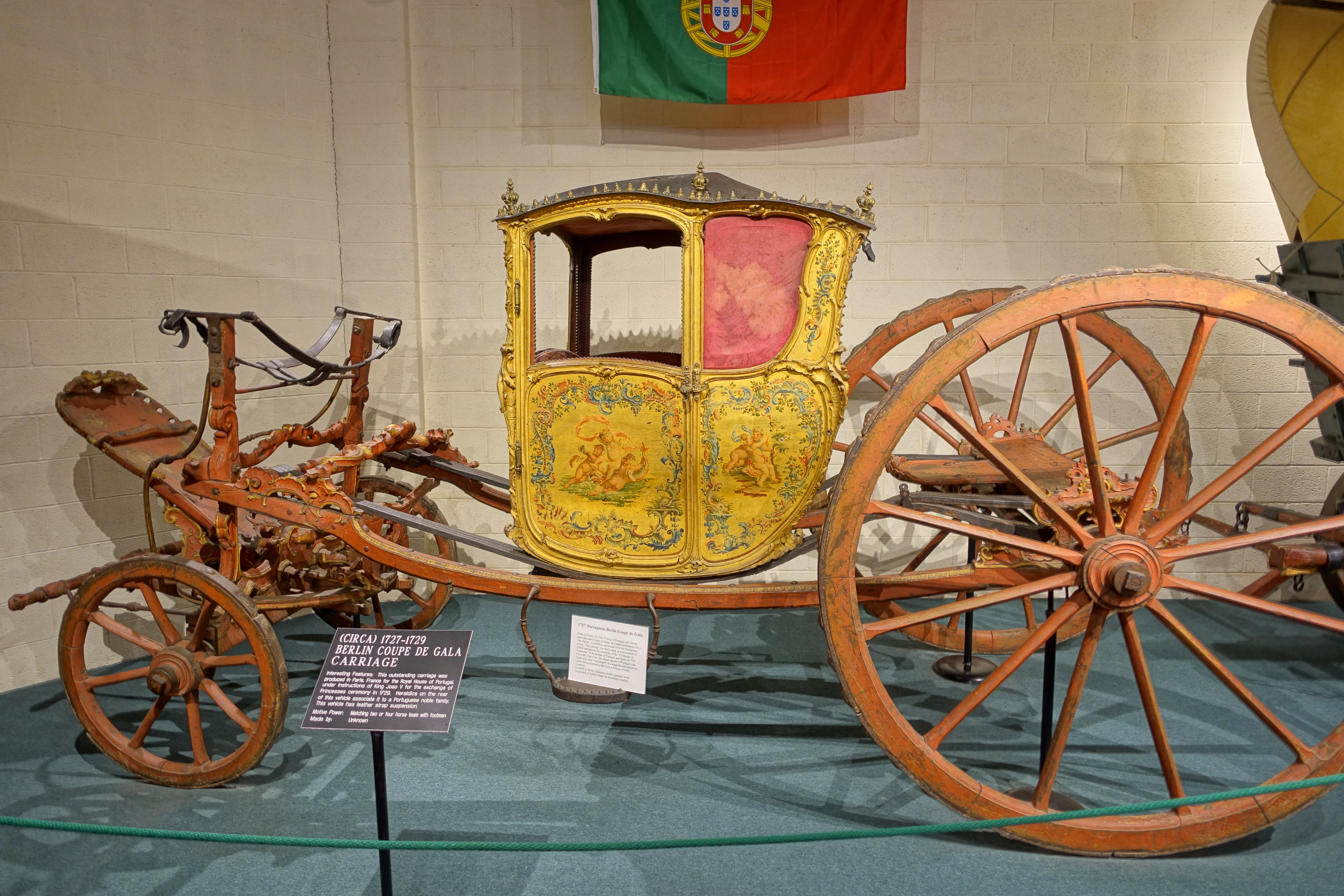
1729 gala coupé, Royal House of Portugal

== See also ==
- Gold coach
- Canadian State Landau
- Japan state carriages (Simple Wikipedia, Japanese Wikipedia)
