= Irish State Coach =

1851 horse-drawn carriage used by the British royal family

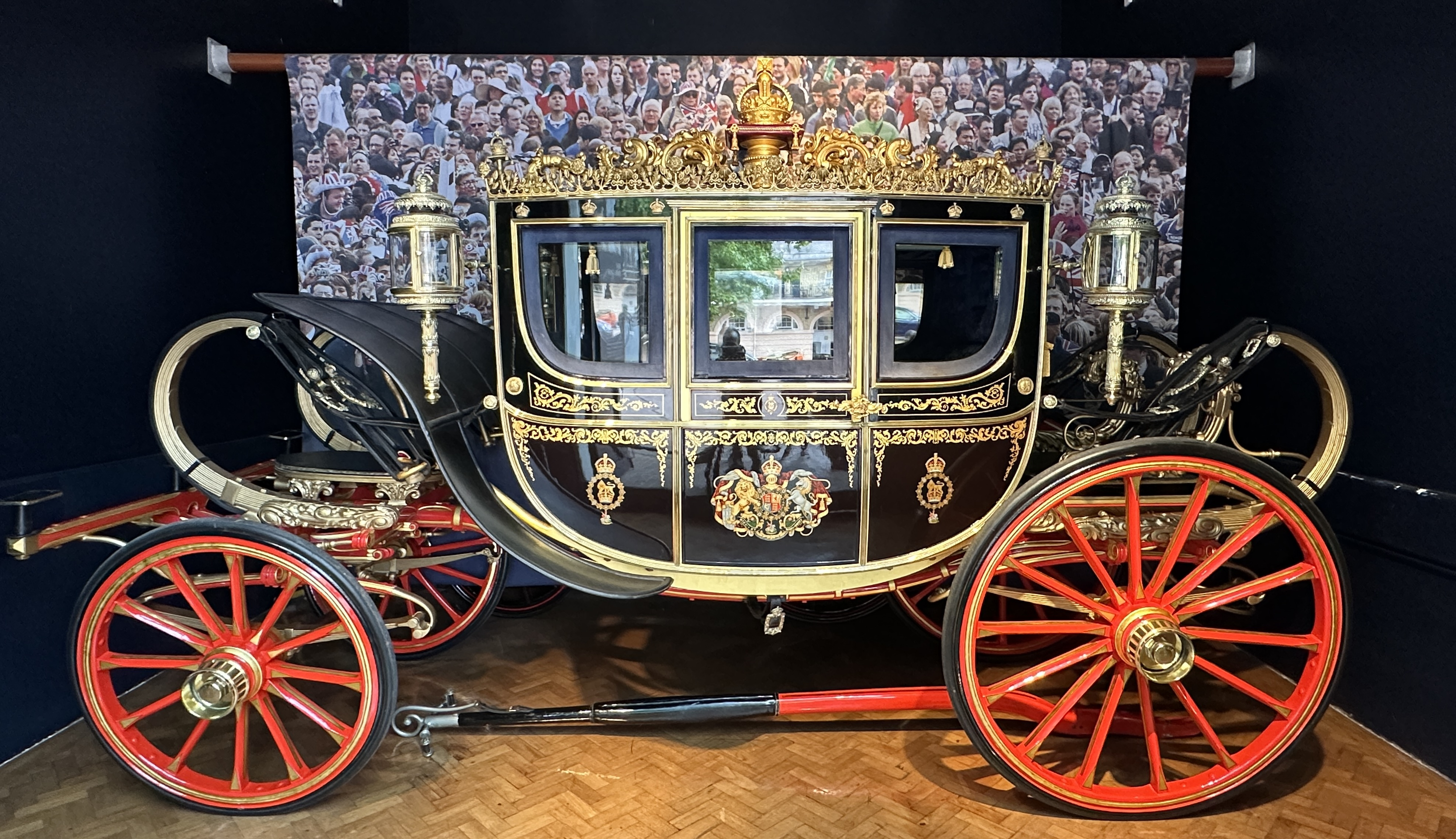
- Artist: Coachbuilders: John Hutton & Sons (1851); Barker & Co. (1911)
- Completion date: 1851, reconstructed 1911
- Type: Berlin
- Condition: Restored 1980s. Currently in use.
- Location: Royal Mews
- Owner: The Crown

The Irish State Coach is an enclosed, four-horse-drawn carriage used by the British royal family. It is the traditional horse-drawn coach in which the British monarch travels from Buckingham Palace to the Palace of Westminster to formally open the new legislative session of the UK Parliament. It is displayed at the Royal Mews when not in use.

== Description ==
The exterior paint is dark brown (Note: The coloring has variously been reported as dark blue or black, however the Royal Collections Trust reports it as dark brown. Carriage paint finishes include multiple layers of varnish. A dark base coloration, reflections in the varnish, and lighting conditions, can easily take on surrounding colors.) with gilt decoration. The interior and the window surrounds are finished in blue damask. There are crests and gilding on the side panels. The top has a gilded frieze and a central crown. The frieze symbolically contains roses for England, thistles for Scotland, shamrocks for Ireland, and palm trees for India. The coach was originally constructed to be driven from a coachman's seat covered in a hammercloth, using four horses. It has been modified so the coachman's seat is removable and the coach can be postilion-driven.

Irish State Coach

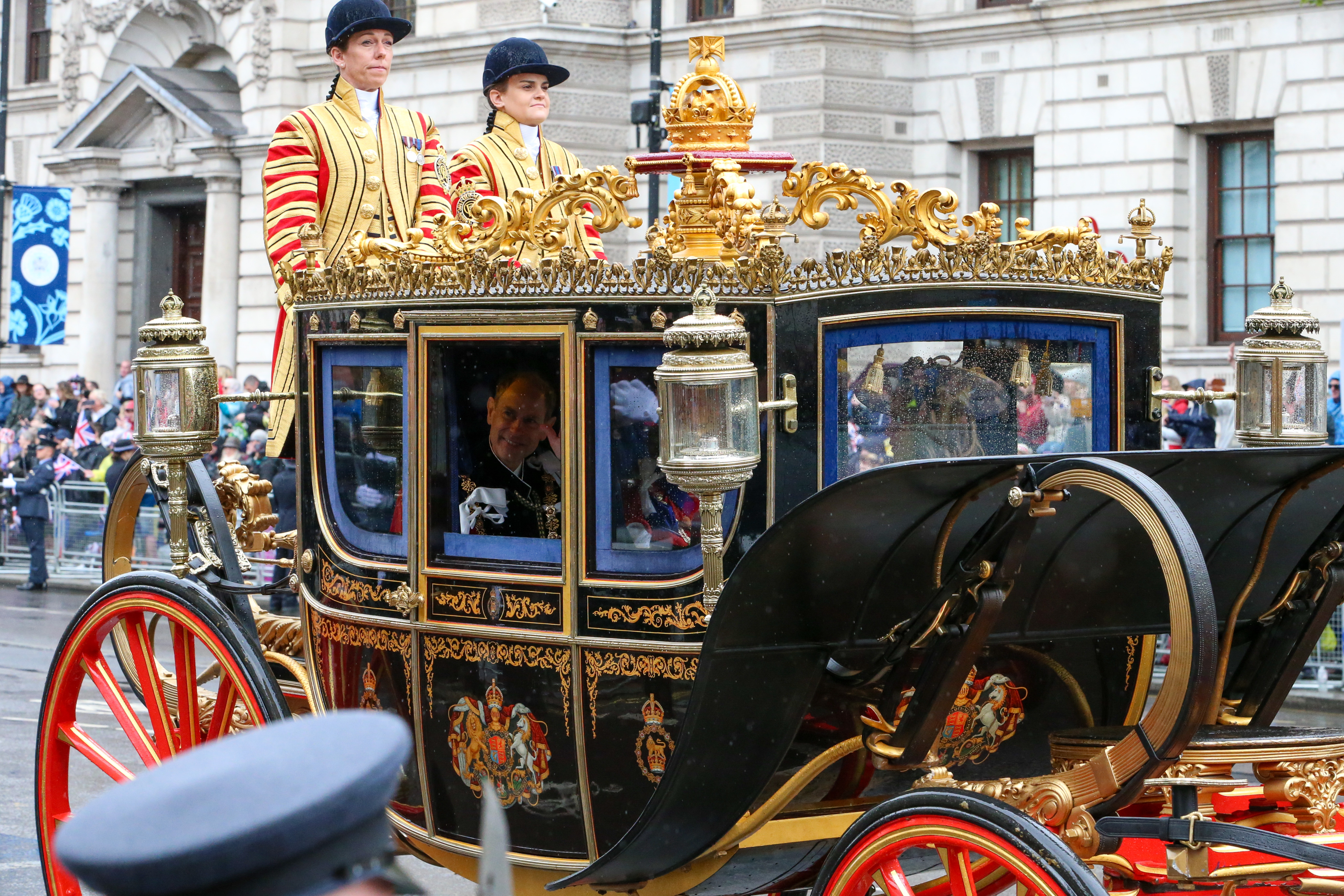
Shows the blue window surrounds, crests, gilding, and frieze

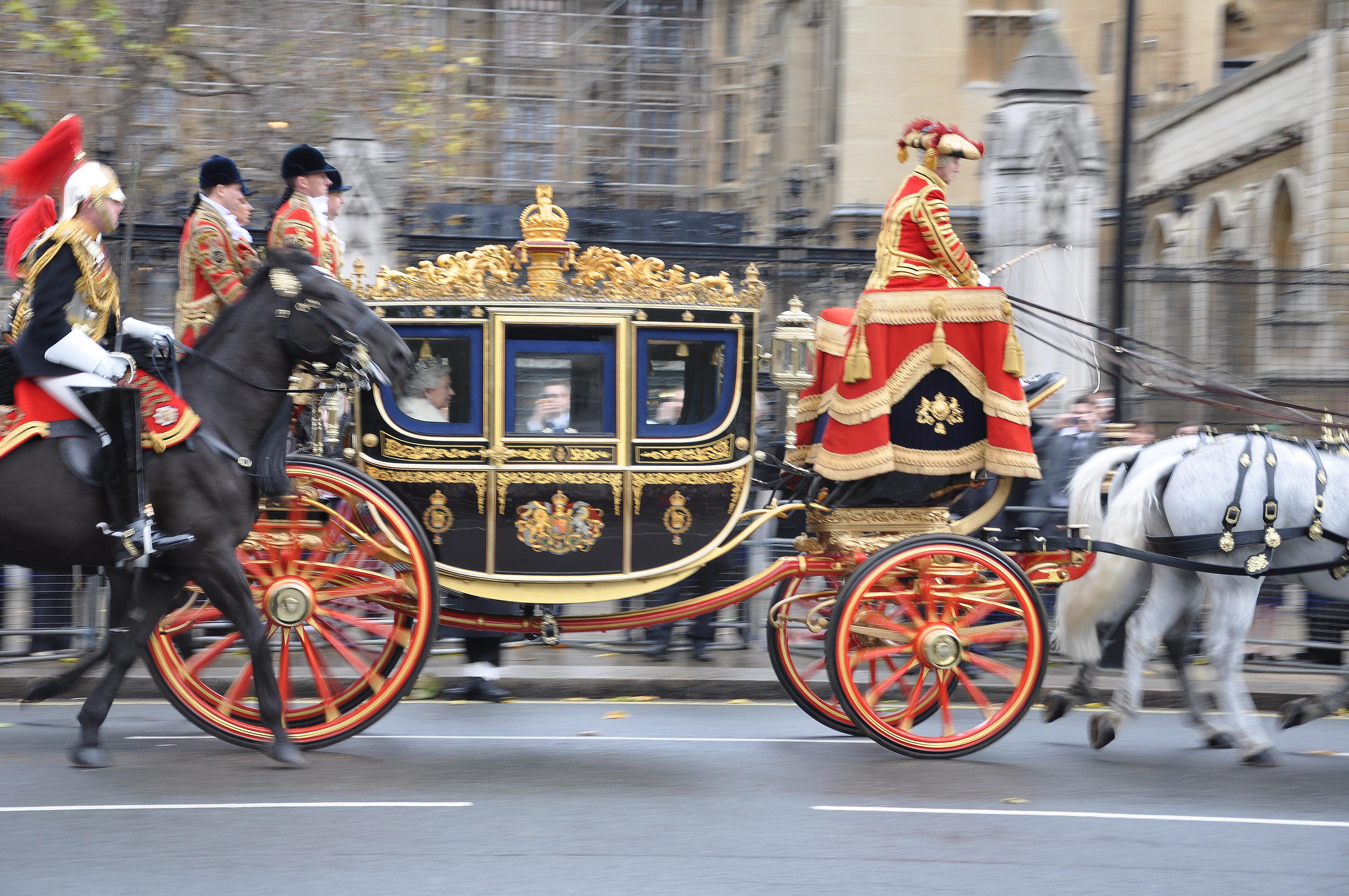
Arranged for coachman-driven

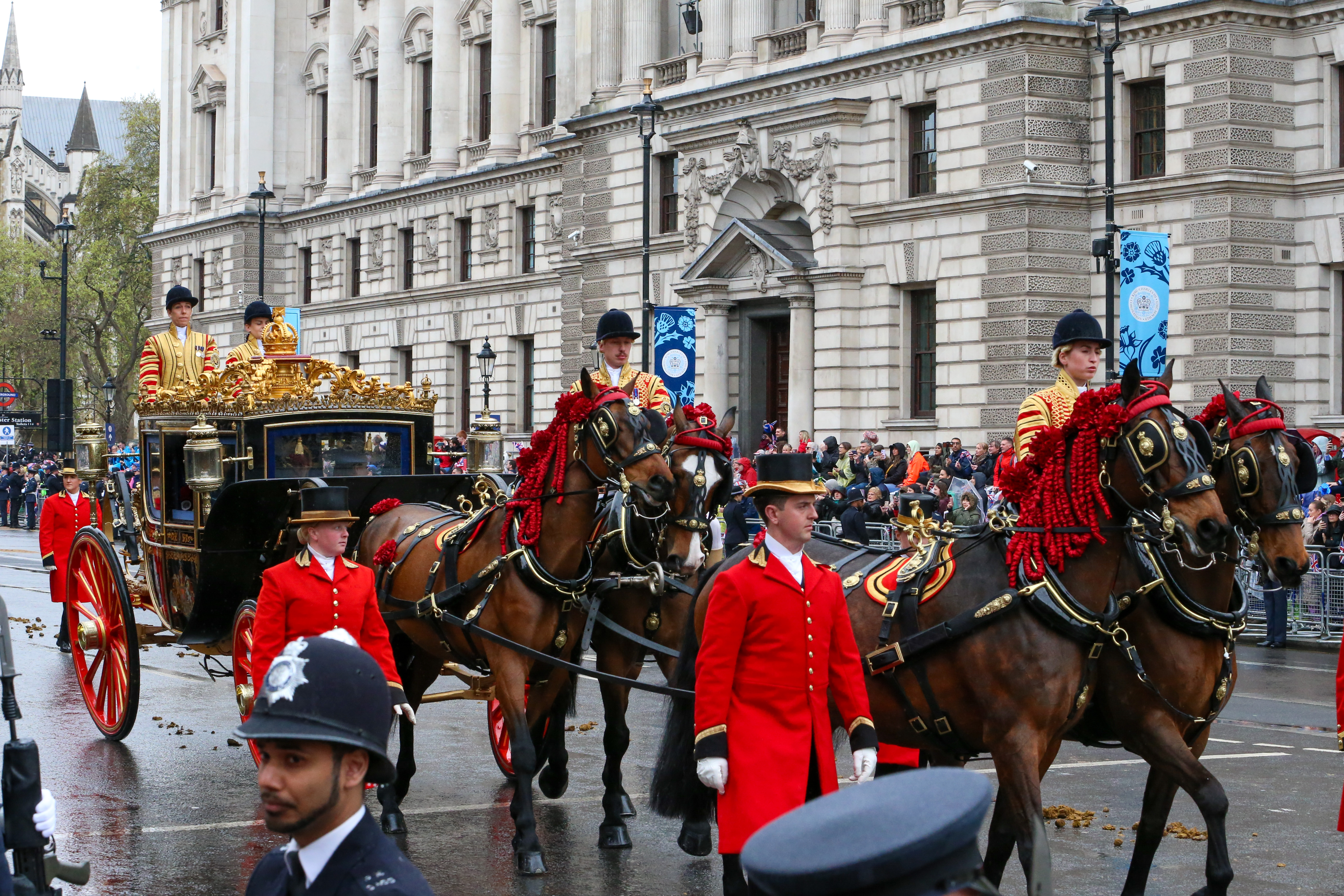
Arranged for postilion-driven

== History ==
The original Irish State Coach was built as a speculative venture in 1851 by John Hutton & Sons of Dublin, who held a Royal Warrant as coachbuilders to Queen Victoria. Exhibited at the 1853 Great Industrial Exhibition, it was admired by the Queen, purchased and delivered to the Royal Mews. From 1861 it became the Queen's state carriage of choice, as she declined to use the Gold State Coach following the death of Prince Albert.

Under Edward VII, when use of the Gold Coach resumed, the Irish coach was made available for the Prince of Wales to use, and decorated with his insignia. Prior to his coronation as George V, the coach was sent for refurbishment to the workshops of Barker & Co. of Notting Hill. Whilst there, in 1911, it was extensively damaged by fire (with only the metal framework left intact); however, Barkers completely reconstructed it to the original design in the space of nineteen weeks, in time for it to be used in the coronation procession.

After the end of the Second World War the Irish State Coach (in place of the Gold Coach) came to be used habitually by the monarch at the State Opening of Parliament. It was also used on other occasions, including conveying King George VI and Queen Elizabeth II (then Princess Elizabeth) to Westminster Abbey for her wedding to Prince Philip, Duke of Edinburgh. In 1960 it was modified to enable it to be drawn using postilion-ridden horses, as an alternative to being driven by a coachman from the box seat.

In 1988 the new Australian State Coach arrived at the mews, which went on to be used in place of the Irish State Coach on some state occasions (especially in cold weather). That same year the opportunity was taken for a complete restoration of the Irish coach to be undertaken by the Royal Mews carriage restorers—the first time such an extensive restoration had been undertaken in-house. It was entirely repainted and regilded, and completed in time to carry the Queen and the Duke of Edinburgh to the State Opening of Parliament once again in November 1989.

== Modern use ==
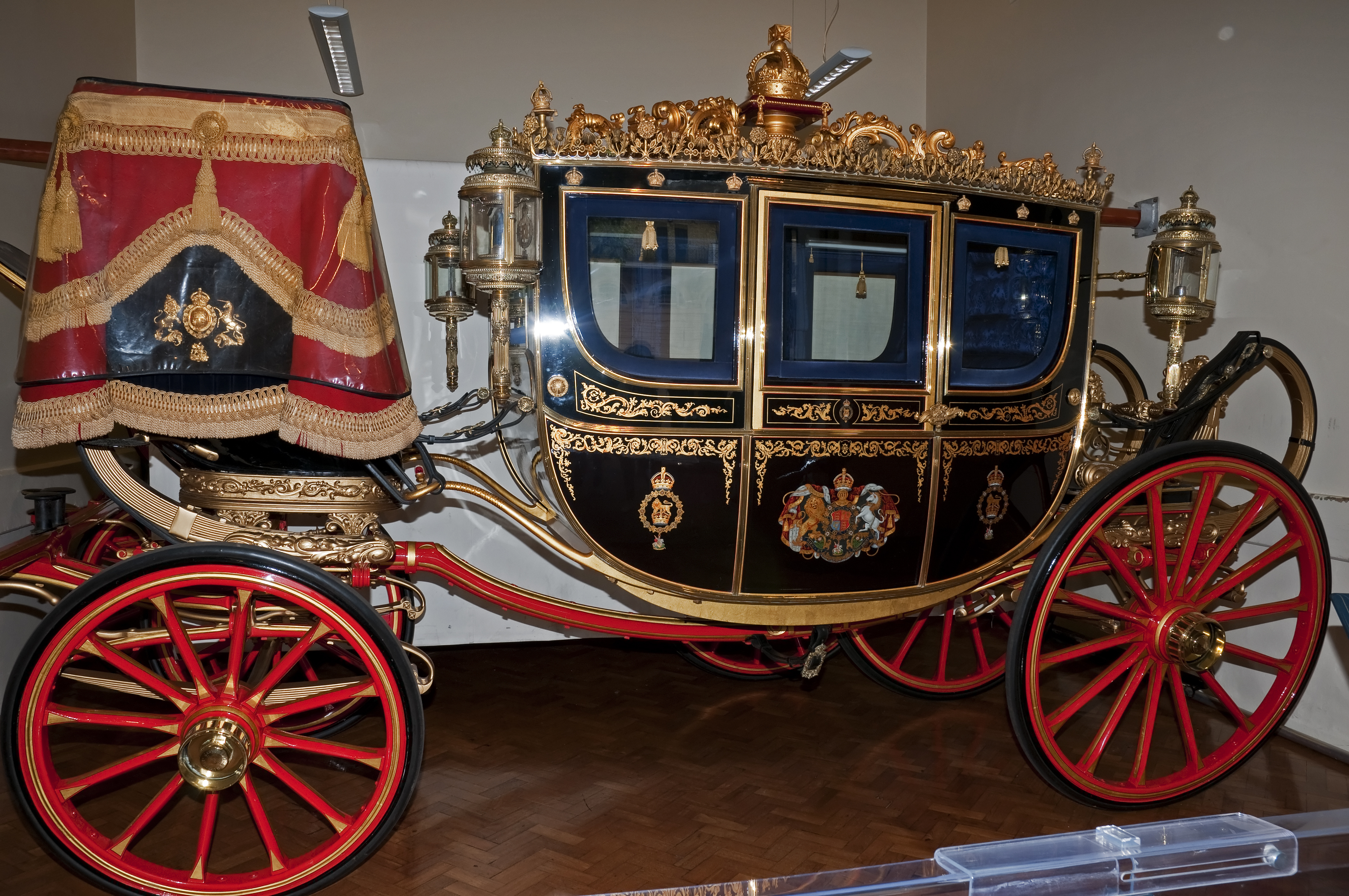
The Irish State Coach on public display at the Royal Mews (2010)

Along with several other royal state coaches, the Irish State Coach is stored in the Royal Mews, where it can be seen by the public.

After its restoration, the Irish State Coach continued to be used interchangeably with the Australian State Coach by Queen Elizabeth for the State Opening of Parliament (as well as on other occasions). In the last decade of her reign, when the Queen regularly used the Diamond Jubilee State Coach, the Irish coach was used to carry the Prince of Wales and the Duchess of Cornwall to and from the State Opening. More recently, it was used by the Duke and Duchess of Edinburgh, as well as their children James, Earl of Wessex and Lady Louise Windsor, during the procession from Westminster Abbey to Buckingham Palace during the Coronation of Charles III and Camilla.

In May 2026, the King and Queen rode in the Irish State Coach to the opening of parliament.

The coach is also used during state visits, such as the Nigerian state visit in March 2026, when the coach carried the Prince and Princess of Wales together with Attorney-General Lateef Fagbemi and Ambassador Bianca Odumegwu-Ojukwu in the carriage procession to Windsor Castle.

== See also ==
- List of state coaches
- State opening of Parliament
