= Coupé (carriage) =

Shortened coach

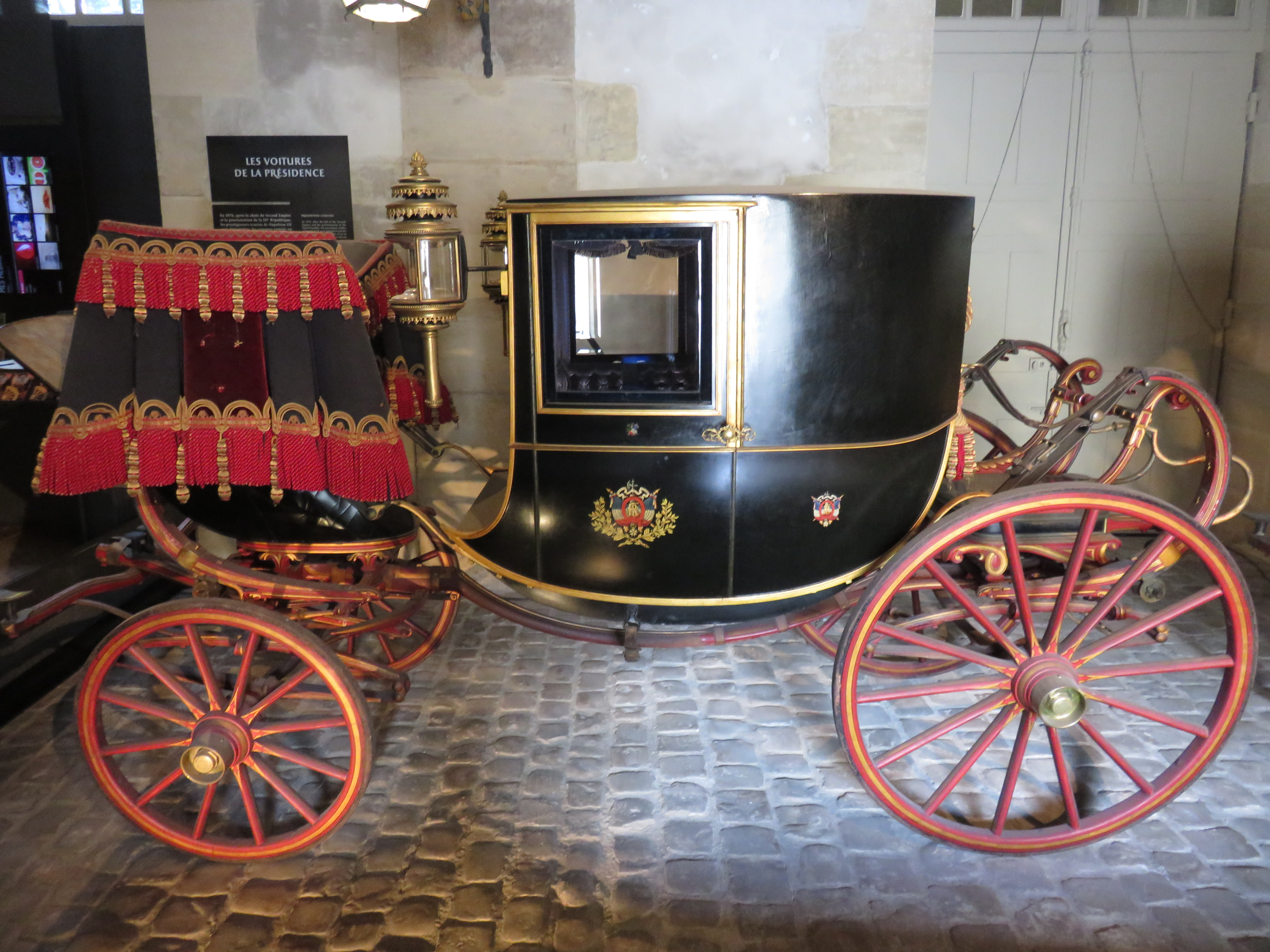
A coupé, France

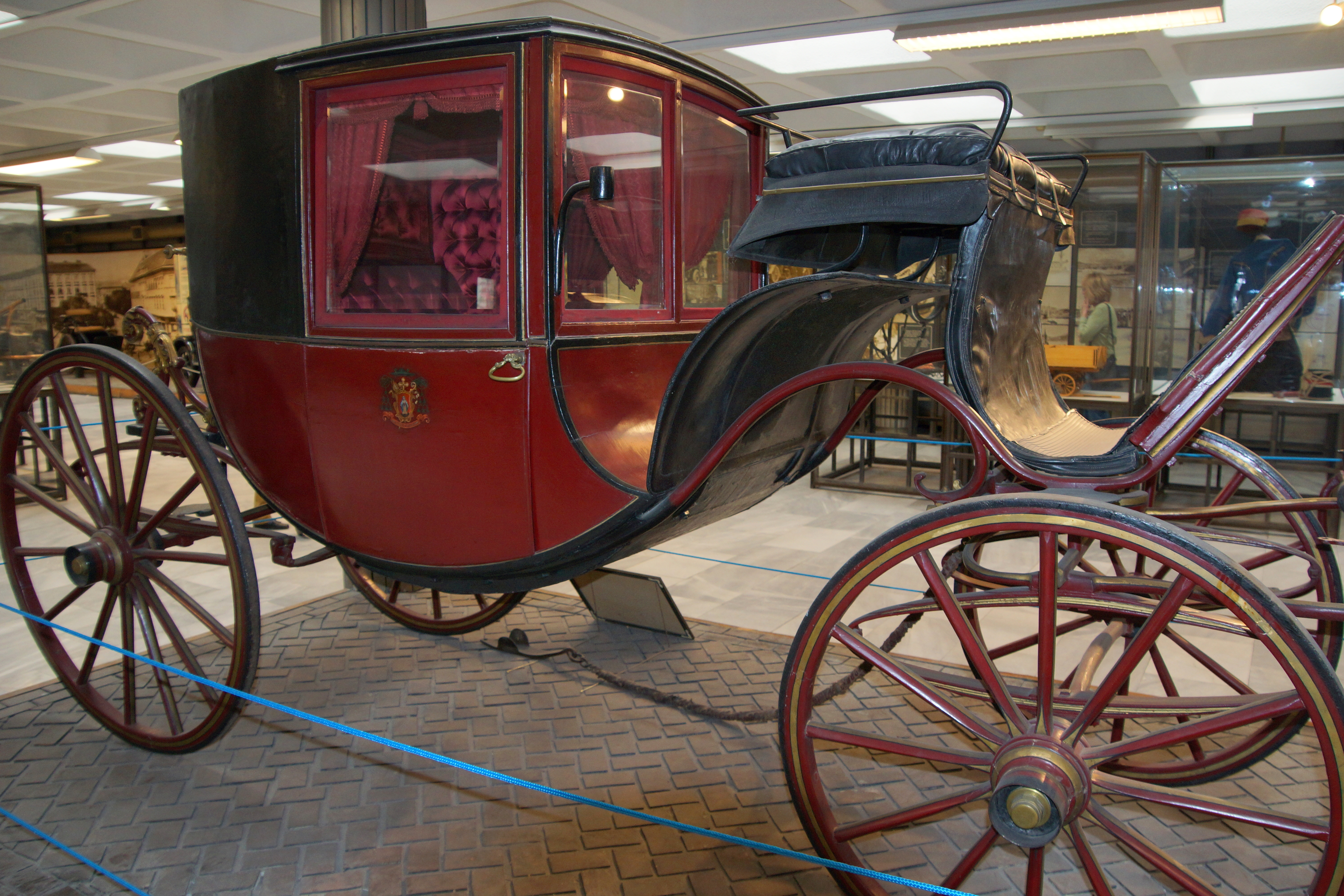
A coupé, Hungary

A coupé or coupe or chariot is a compact enclosed four-wheeled carriage. From the French word coupé meaning to "cut", its design was derived from the Berlin coach by shortening the front. The British preferred to use the word chariot rather than coupé. According to Stratton (1878), the coupé was considered an ideal vehicle for women to use to go shopping or to make social visits.

== Design ==
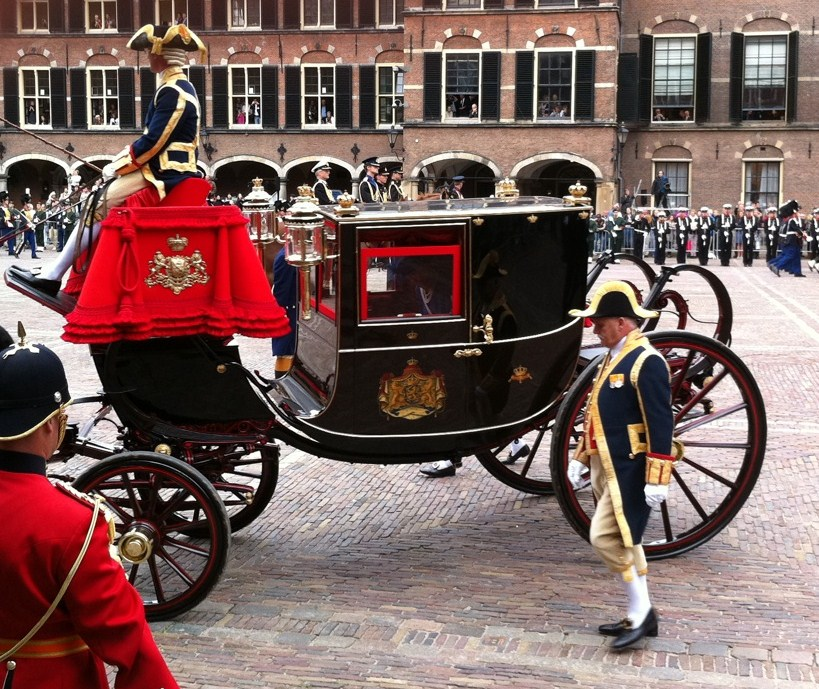
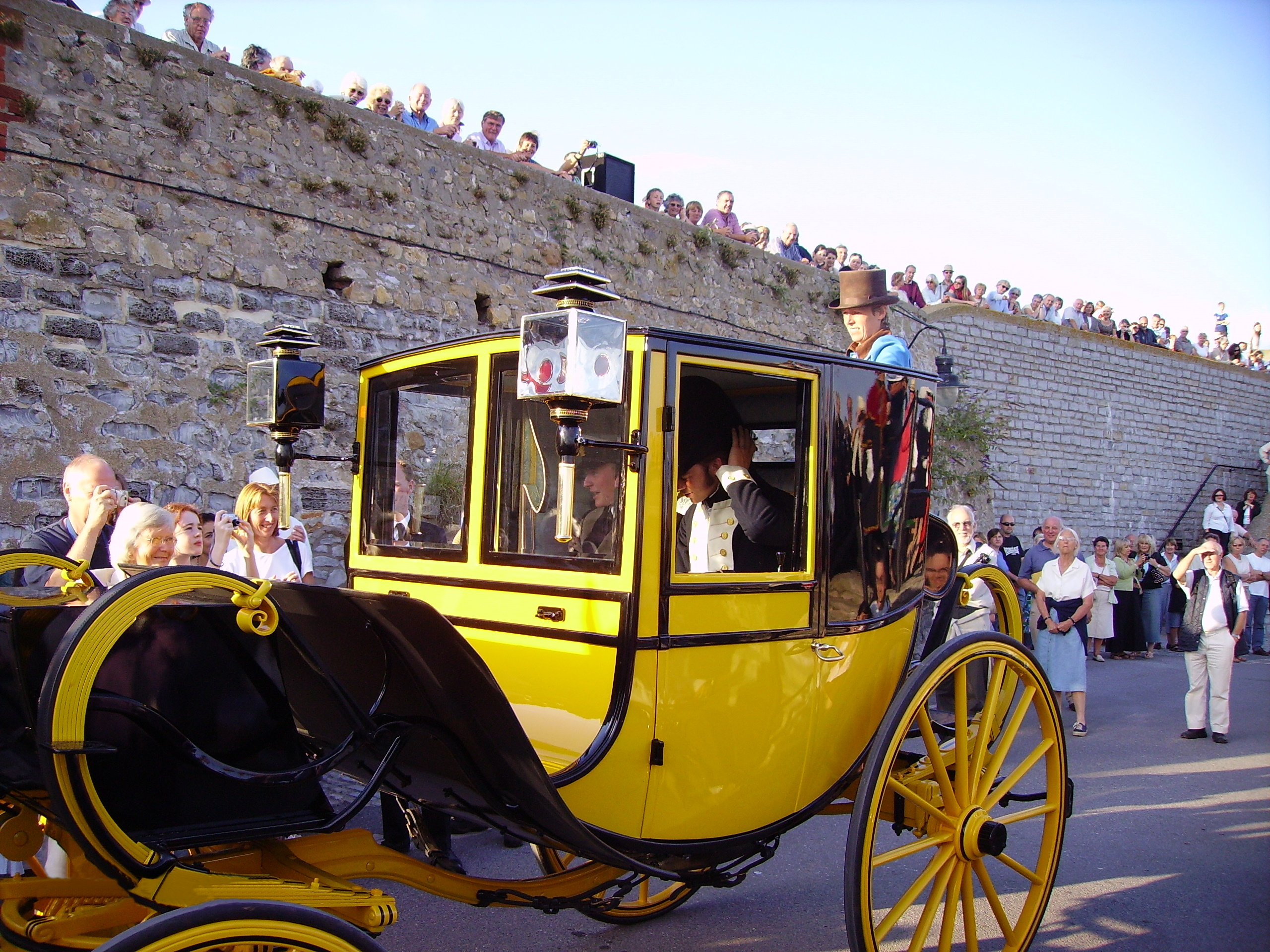
Compare the passengers' view when a coupé is coachman-driven (above) and postilion-driven (below).

The coupé is a carriage in the coach class. Coupé, meaning 'cut' in French, is a shortened version of a Berlin style coach by cutting the coach at the front door pillar and making that the front corner pillar of the body. The front has a fixed window and the lower front edge of the coupé body usually has a curve, forming a sort of "J" shape. A coupé has a single seat for two people facing forward, losing the rear-facing front seat of the coach. The coupé has a front window which the Berlin coach usually does not, though when a coachman is sitting on a seat draped with a hammercloth, the passengers do not have a view. The best passenger viewing is when the coupé is drawn by horses guided by a postilion (rider).

The coupé or chariot is built with a perch and a closed body. Earlier designs were suspended with four whip springs and later cee-springs. There is a full-length half-glass door on each side of the main compartment. Hammercloths are color-coordinated with the paint of the body, and arms and crests are often painted on the doors and quarter panels. A dress or state chariot usually has two footmen dressed in livery standing on the rear platform.

Most coupés were built on the same pattern and were named after their purpose.

- A state or dress chariot is elaborately decorated with luxurious fabrics, fine paintwork, illustrations, and gilded ornaments. Coachmen and footmen would be dressed in livery.
- A town chariot is less elaborate with sombre colors.
- A traveling chariot or private posting chariot is a privately-owned carriage that was used for long-distance travel by the wealthy.
- A post chaise is a hired carriage for long-distance traveling. Often fleets of these were painted yellow and called Yellow Bounders.

== Variations ==
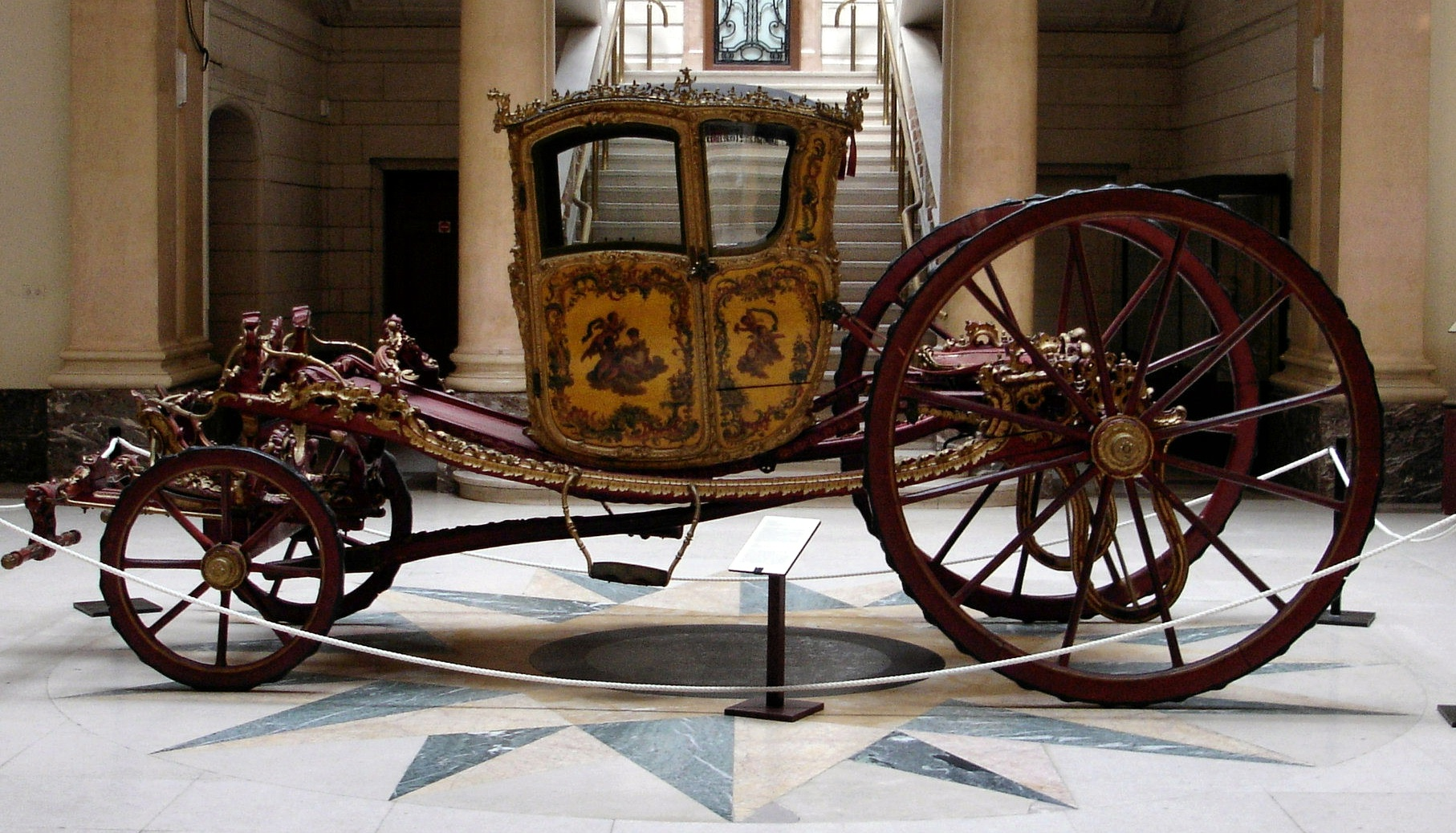
A carosse coupé of Portuguese origin in Brussels

- Carosse coupé: A cut-down version of the larger carosse, a coach in the 17th century to the early 18th century which has no springs, though some use thoroughbraces or straps for a type of suspension.
- Brougham: A successor design to the coupé that is smaller, lighter and lower than the previous designs and usually has a straight front to the body. In the US, most Broughams were called coupés.
- Dorsay coupé: A type of Brougham with a double suspension.

== Historical context ==
The coupé came about in order to lighten the weight of a coach, make it more compact and convenient, or otherwise modify it. Coupéing a coach design originally meant cutting in any dimension or direction. Shortening the length is the style most associated with the word, though coach designs were cut in many ways. Cutting off the coach front from the door pillar forward, is the chariot or coupé. The Clarence is a 3/4 coach, cutting only a portion of the front. Cutting a coach's top made the Landau. Cutting a coach from front to back made a narrow coach with two face-to-face seats for a single passenger each seat, is called a Vis-à-vis. And cutting the Vis-à-vis to shorten it created a one-seater coupé or 1/4 coach called a desobligeant or disobliger.

The British preferred to use the more classical word chariot over the French coupé. In the US, the name coupé referred to a Brougham-type carriage with an arch under the coachman's seat instead of an iron frame with a hammercloth.

There are many coupés displayed in carriage museums around the world.

== Modern usage ==
There are several coupés and gala chariots which are still in use today for parades and ceremonies, including the Golden Coupé of Denmark.

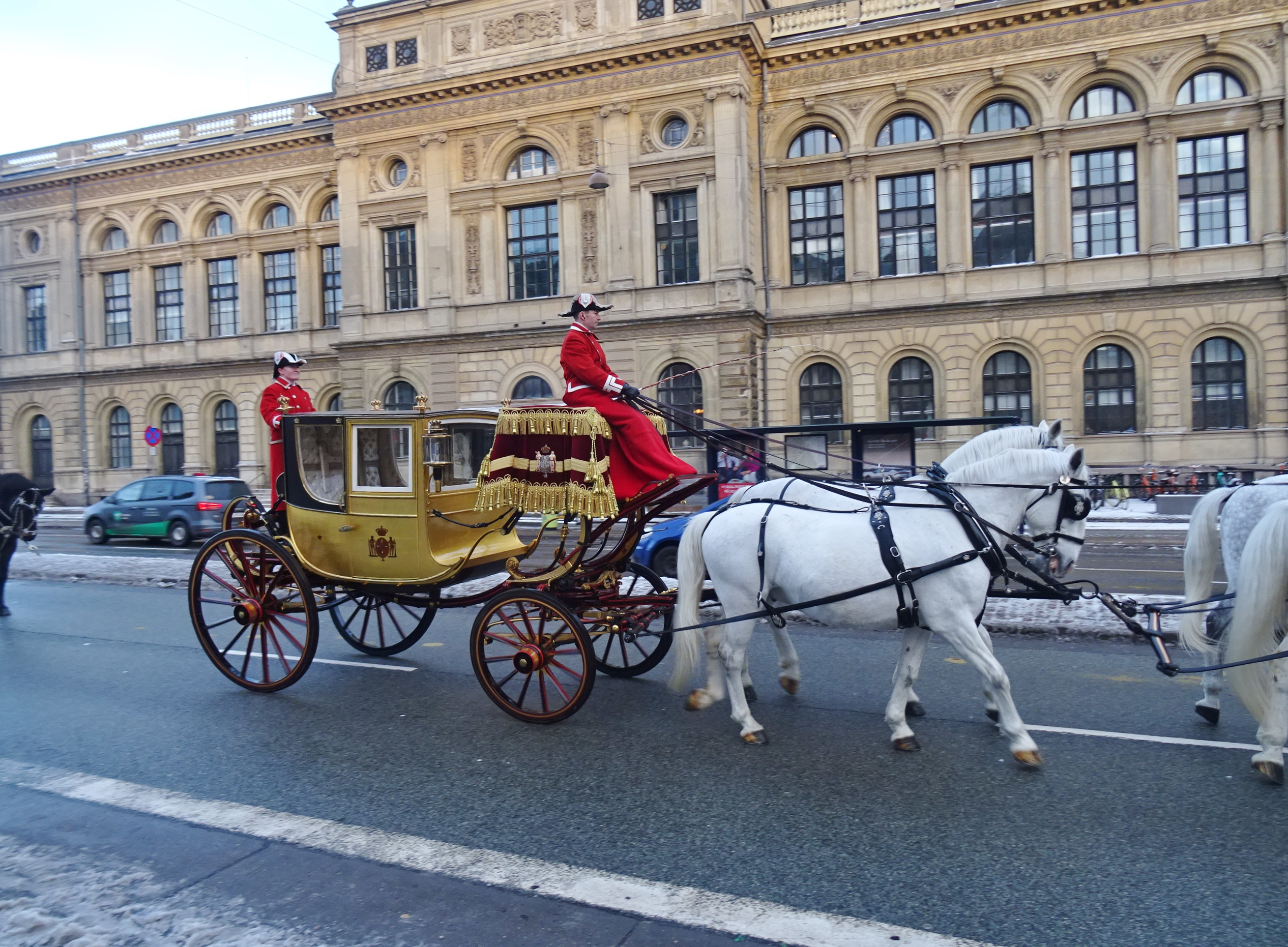
Denmark's Golden Coach is a coupé (2024)

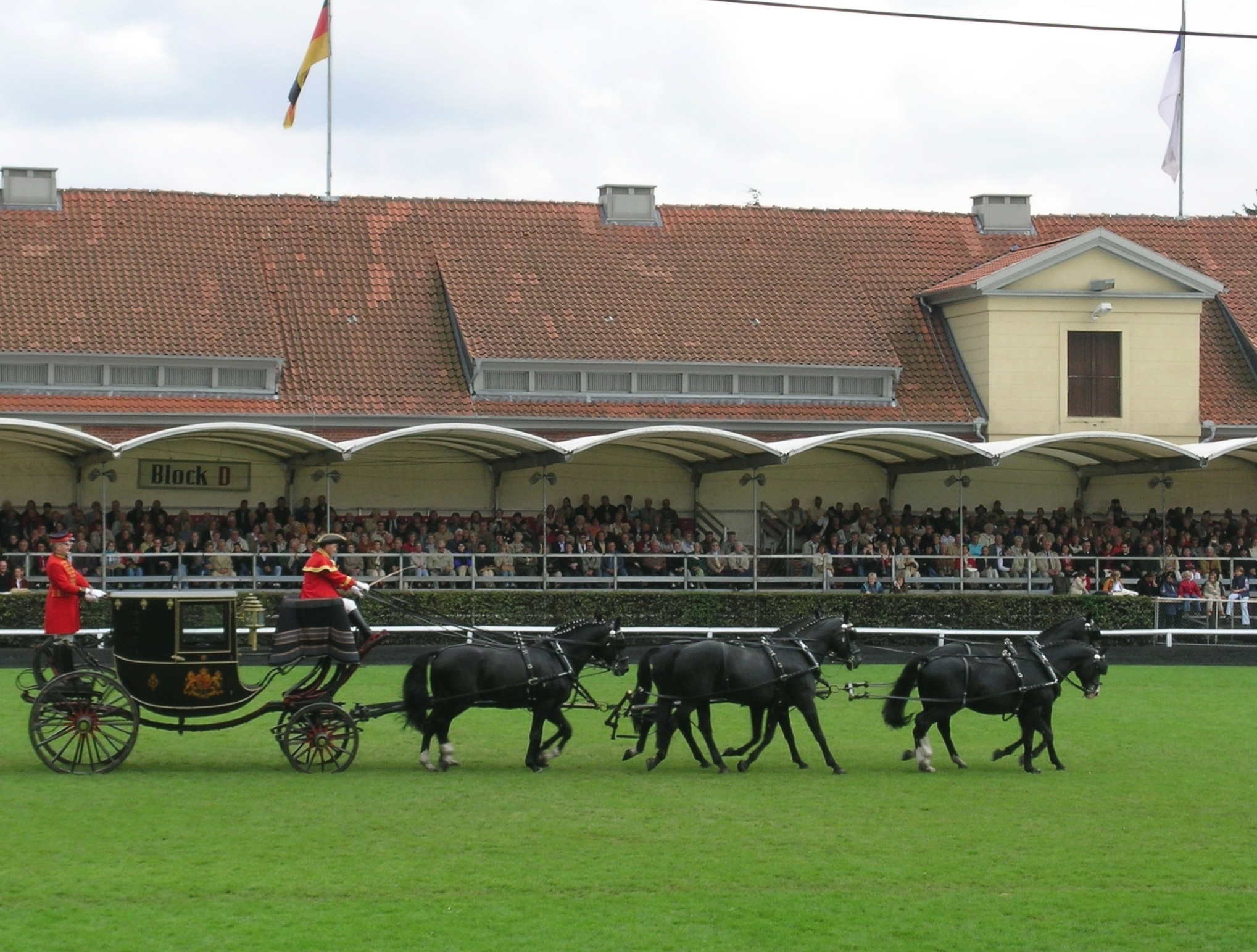
A coupé at the stallion parade for 2004 Celle State Stud

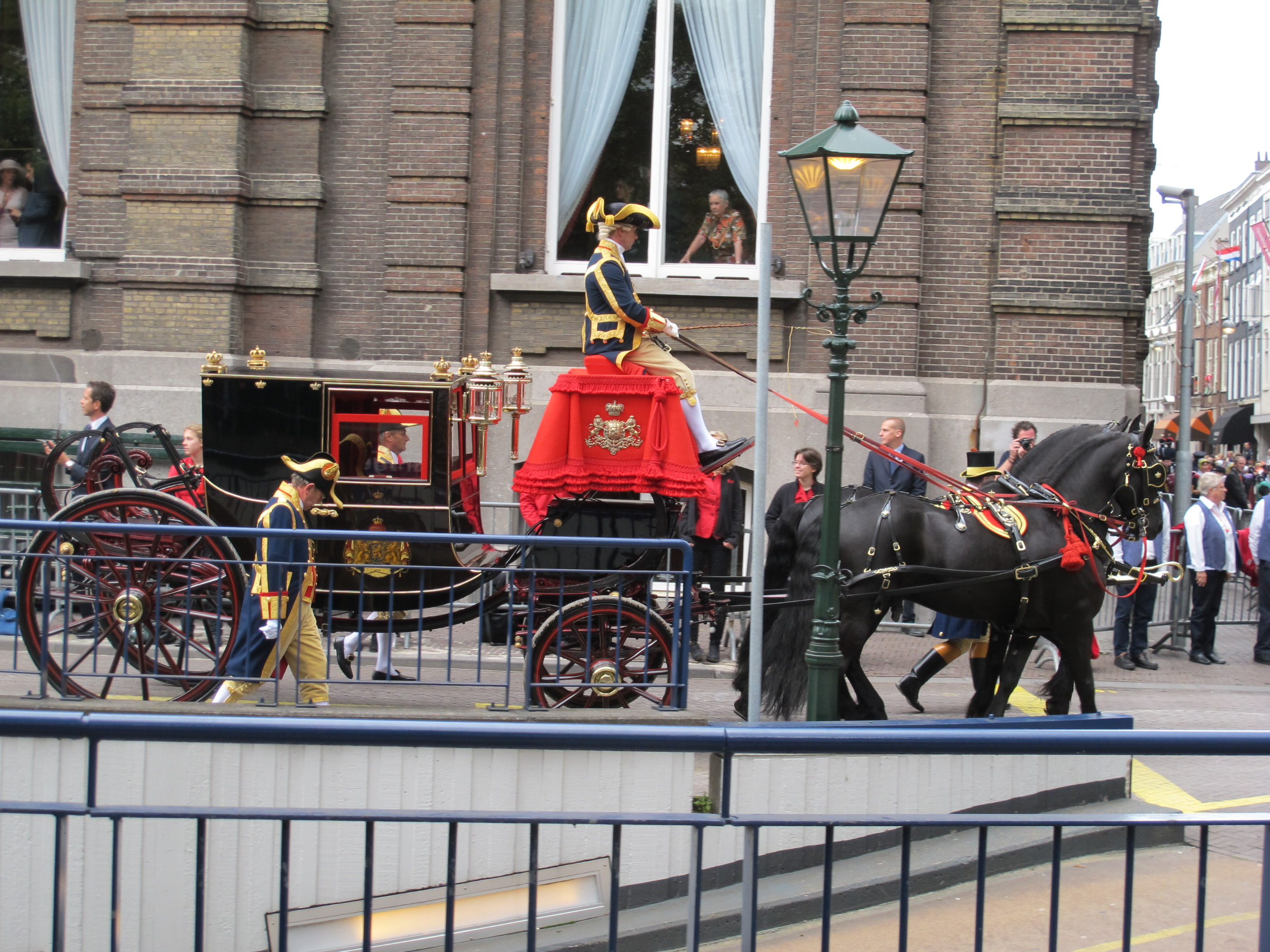
Netherland's 1840 Gala Coupé, 2013

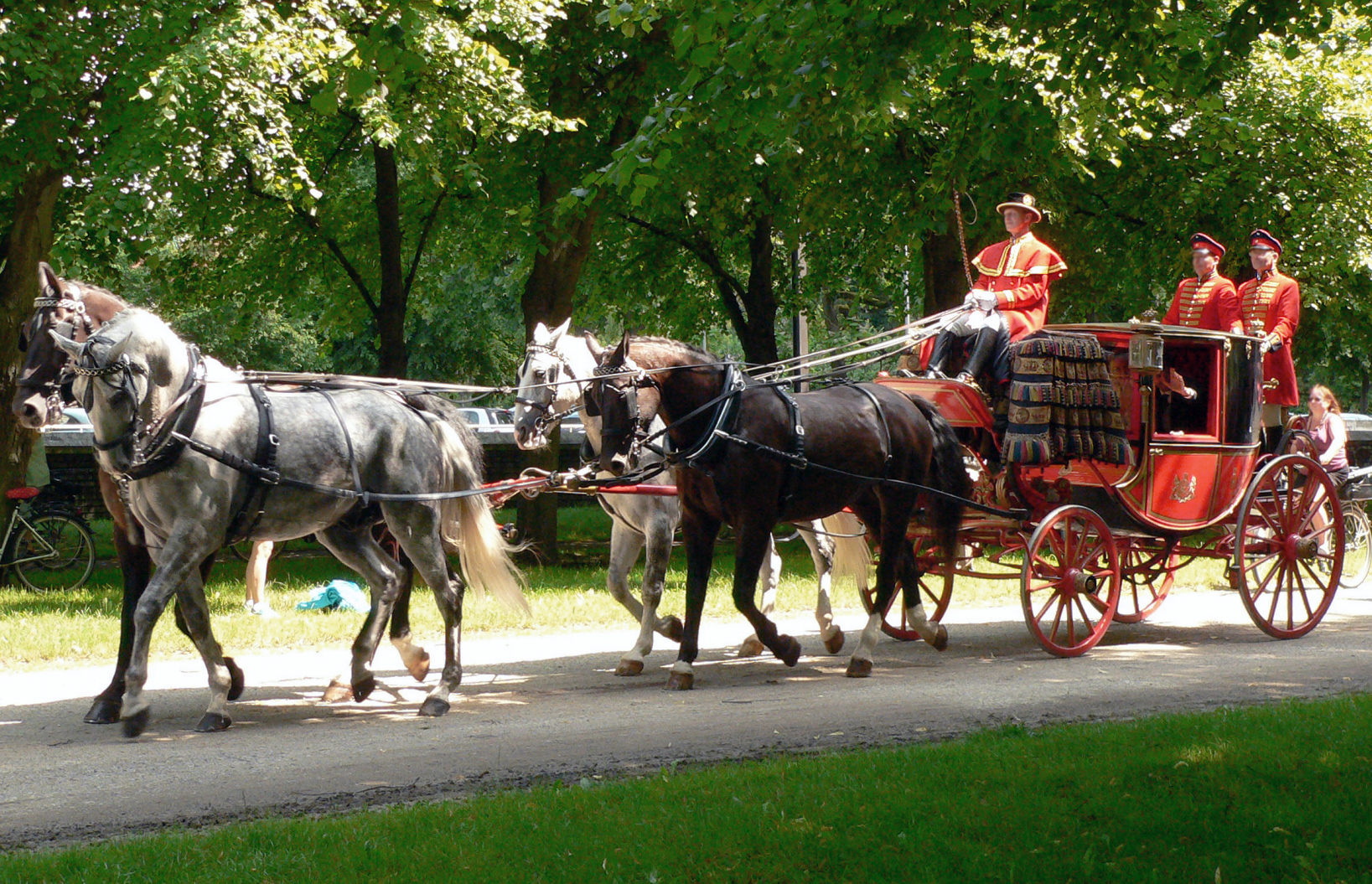
An 1800s coupé at the Celle State Stud in a 2017 wedding

== See also ==
- Coach (carriage)
- Coupe (car)
