= Brougham (carriage) =

Type of horse-drawn carriage

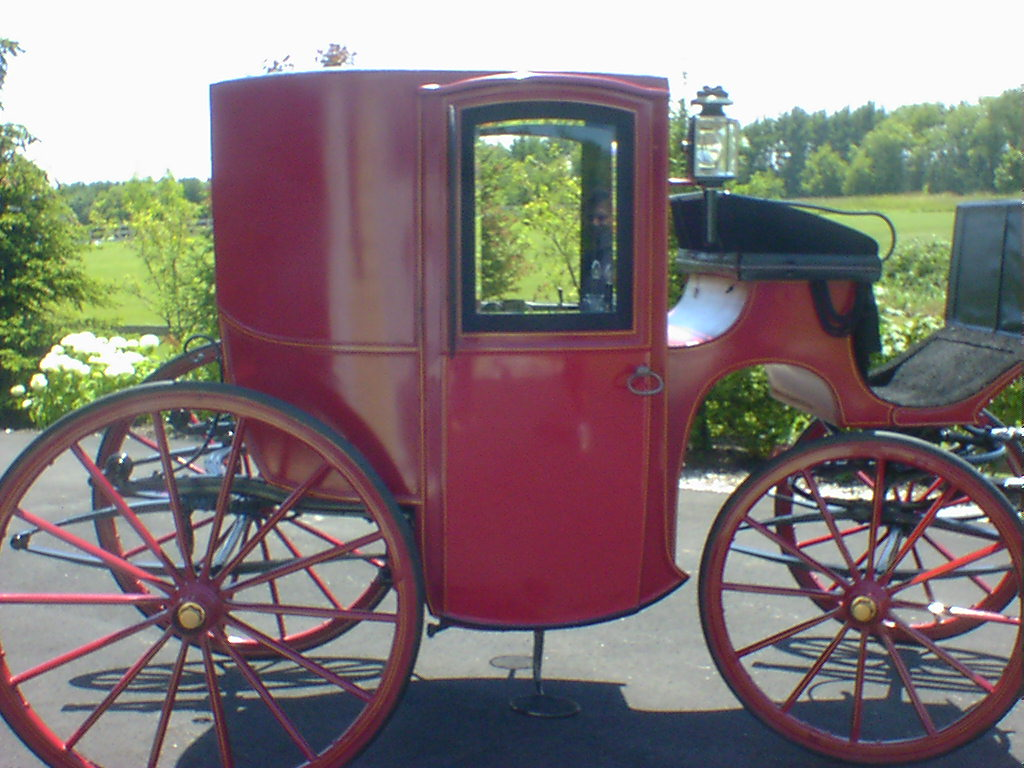
Brougham c. 1890

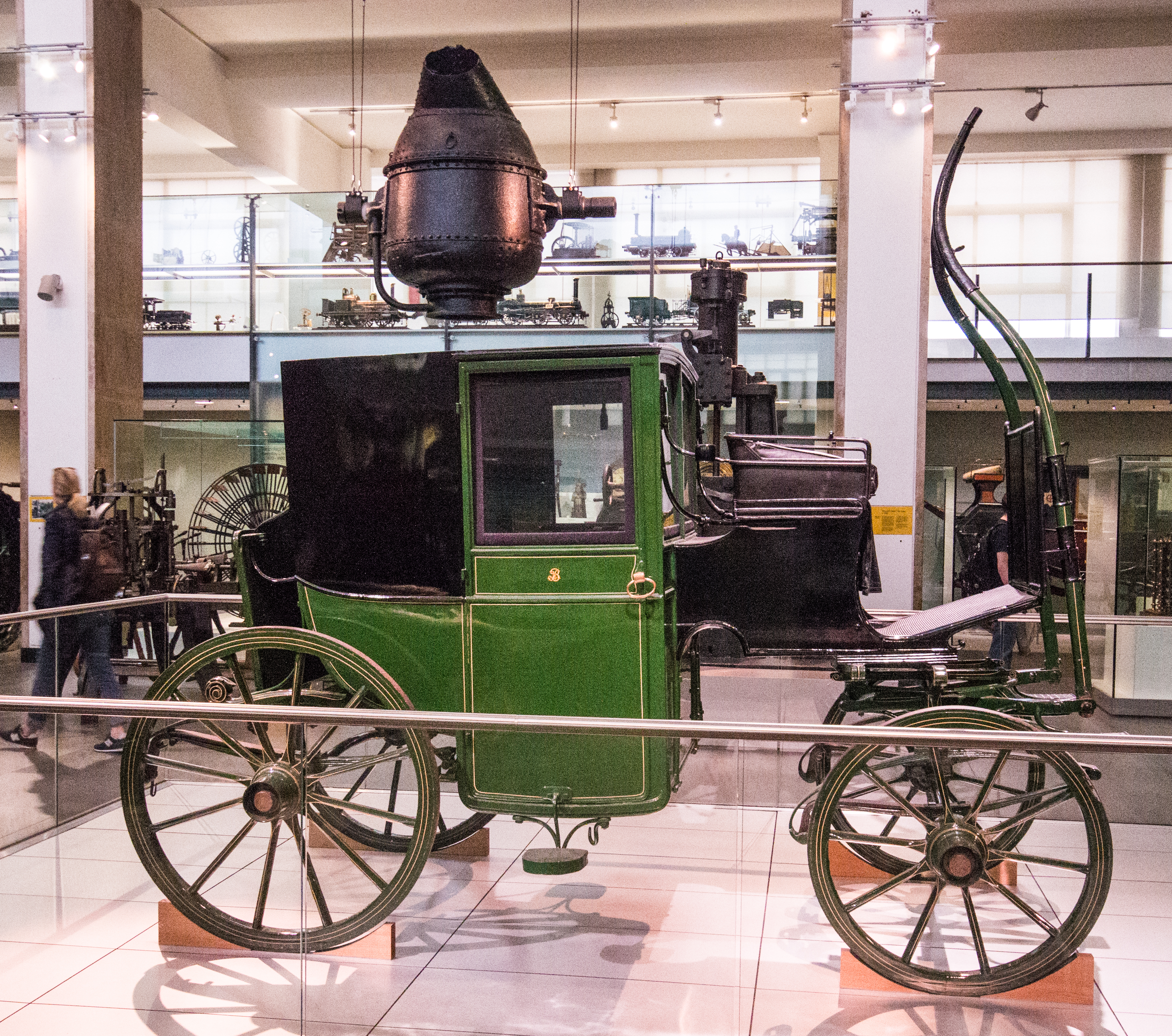
The original 1838 Brougham prototype at the Brougham carriage in Obernzell Castle (2018) London Science Museum

A brougham (Note: Pronounced /ˈbru(ə)m/ BROO-əm or /ˈbroʊ(ə)m/ BROH-əm.) is a 19th century four-wheeled carriage drawn by a single horse. It was named after the politician and jurist Lord Brougham, who had this type of carriage built to his specification by London coachbuilder Robinson & Cook in 1838.

== Description ==
The brougham has an enclosed body with two doors and sits two passengers; there are two fold-away seats in the front corners for small children. It has a box seat in front for a coachman plus one footman or passenger. The carriage body has a front window so that the passengers can see forward. The carriage is mounted on elliptical springs with small front wheels which can go under the carriage to turn sharply. (Note: The OED gives a first usage in 1851, but the original design dates from about 1838, according to the Encyclopædia Britannica. Brougham died in 1868.)

Features specific to the brougham include:

- the absence of a perch (a supporting pole connecting the front and rear axles); the spring hangers were mounted directly to the body structure, saving weight and lowering the floor, to ease entry
- a sharply squared end of the roof at the back,
- a body line curving forward at the base of the enclosure, and
- low entry to the enclosure, using only one outside step below the door.

A brougham-landaulet is a variation with a collapsible top, rearward of the doors.

== See also ==
- Coupé (carriage): another shortened carriage style
- Brougham (car body), inspired by the brougham carriage
- Clarence (carriage), larger version of the Brougham
- Carriage
- Horse-drawn vehicle
