= Golden Coupé (Denmark) =

State coach of Denmark

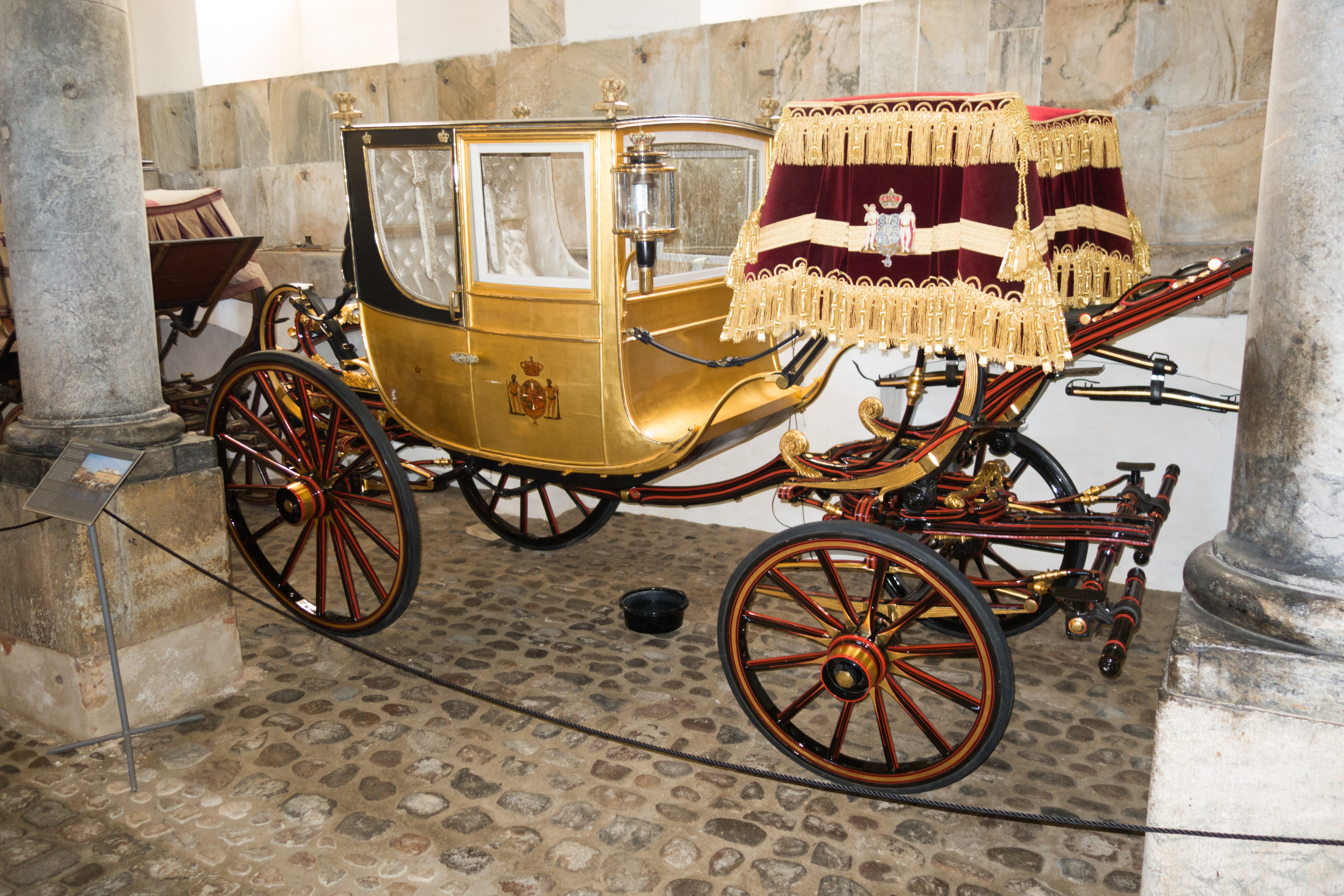
The Golden Coupé in the Royal Mews and Carriage Museum at Christiansborg Palace in Copenhagen

The Golden Coupé (Danish: Guldkareten), also known as State Coach No. 1 (Danish: Statskaret Nr. 1), is the finest of the carriages still used by the Danish royal family. Built in Henry Fife's Copenhagen workshop in 1839–1840, it was first used by Christian VIII. Since then, it has been used by all Danish monarchs. It is used today by Margrethe II for the annual New Year's levee in January as well as for special occasions, such as jubilees and state visits.

== History ==
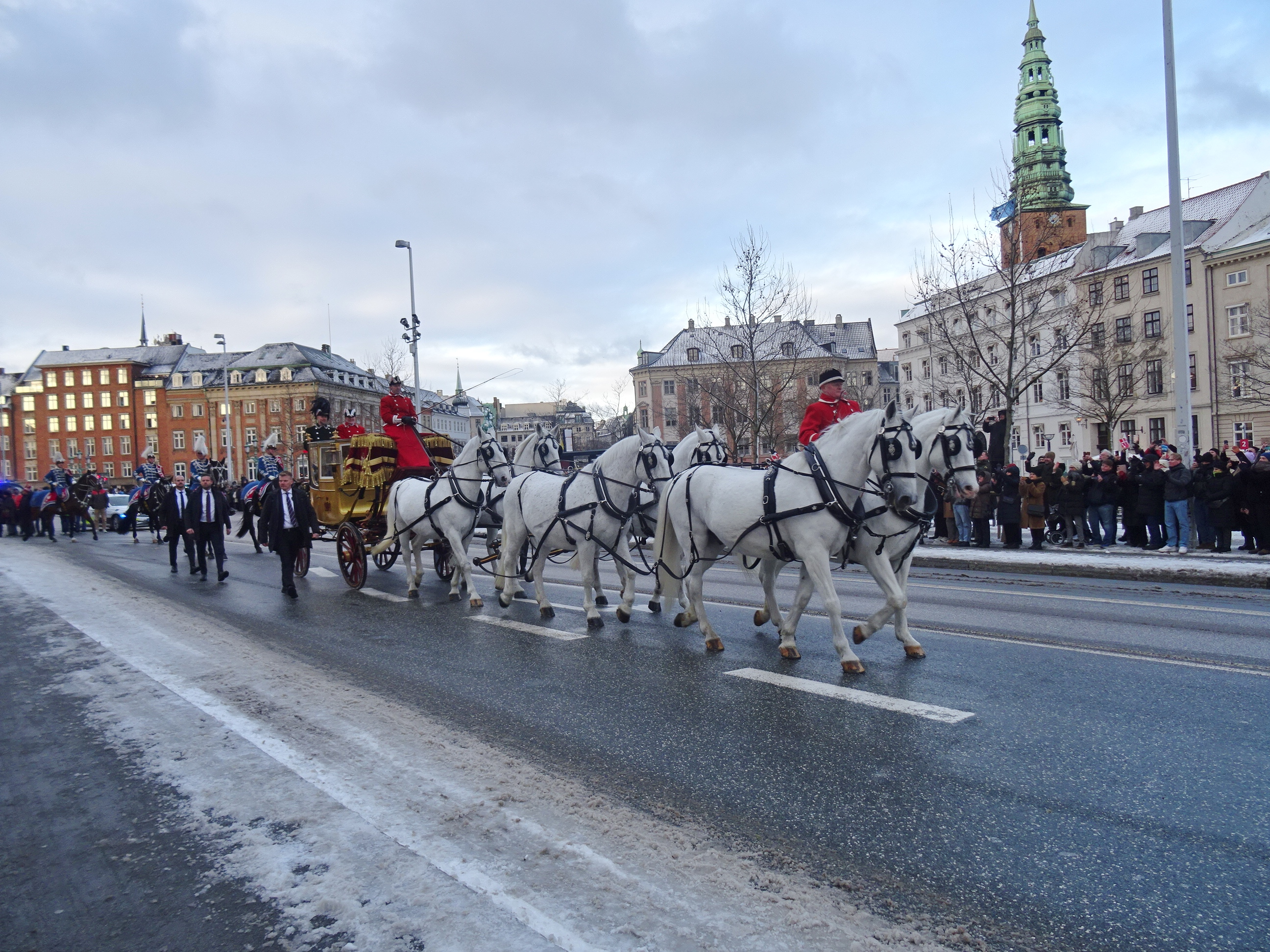
The Golden Coupé is drawn by six horses.

Delivered to the Royal Mews by Henry Fife in 1840, it has previously been believed that the Golden Coupé was commissioned for Christian VIII's entry into Copenhagen. However, as shown by Ole Jespersen, based on contemporary newspaper articles, it was in fact commissioned in 1839 for the golden anniversary of Frederik VI and Queen Marie Sofie the following year. When Frederik VI died on 3 December 1839, eight months before the golden anniversary, construction of the Golden Coupé seems to have been put on hold. On 23 November 1840, Aalborg Stiftstidende mentioned that Henry Fife was still at work on the carriage. It can therefore not have been used in connection with Christian VIII's arrival on 5 October. The Golden Coupé seems instead to have been used for the first time on 2 March 1841 for the opening of the Supreme Court. On 10 March 1841, Aarhus Stiftstidende described the event:

Hs. M. Kongens Tog fra Amalienborg til Høisteret bivaantes af en umaadelig Masse af Mennesker den hele Vei igennem. Foran Kongens Vogn var en Snees brillante Eqvipager, efter hvilke Hs. M. kjørte, fulgt af en Garde-Eskorte. Kongen kiørte i en forgyldt Kareth, som var foræret Hs. M. af Enkedronningen og oprindelig bestemt til Sidstnævntes forventede Guldbryllupsfest. Vognen var forspændt med 8 hvide Heste, og ved hver hest gik en Staldkarl, iført det nye smukke Livree. Det guultpletterede Seletøi, som ved denne Leilighed brugtes, skal være fra Christian IVs Tid. (Om Vognen var udspredt det Rygte, at den var forfærdiget til denne Anledning og havde kostet 16.000 Rbdr., uagtet det er vist, at den kun har kostet omtrent 2.200.) Hs. Majestæt var, da han beklædte Retten, iført en karmoisinrød Civilkjole, besat med Brillanter og Epauletter, og en purpurrød Fløiels Kaabe. Ved Siden bar Allerhøists. en med Diamanter besat Kaarde, som Christian VII paa sin Udenlandsreise havde tilkjøbt sig for 6.000 Species. …

The Golden Coupé has been used regularly since then by all Danish monarchs. It was for instance used by Margrethe II for the celebrations in connection with her 25-year government jubilee in 1997 and her 40-year jubilee in 2012.

== Description ==
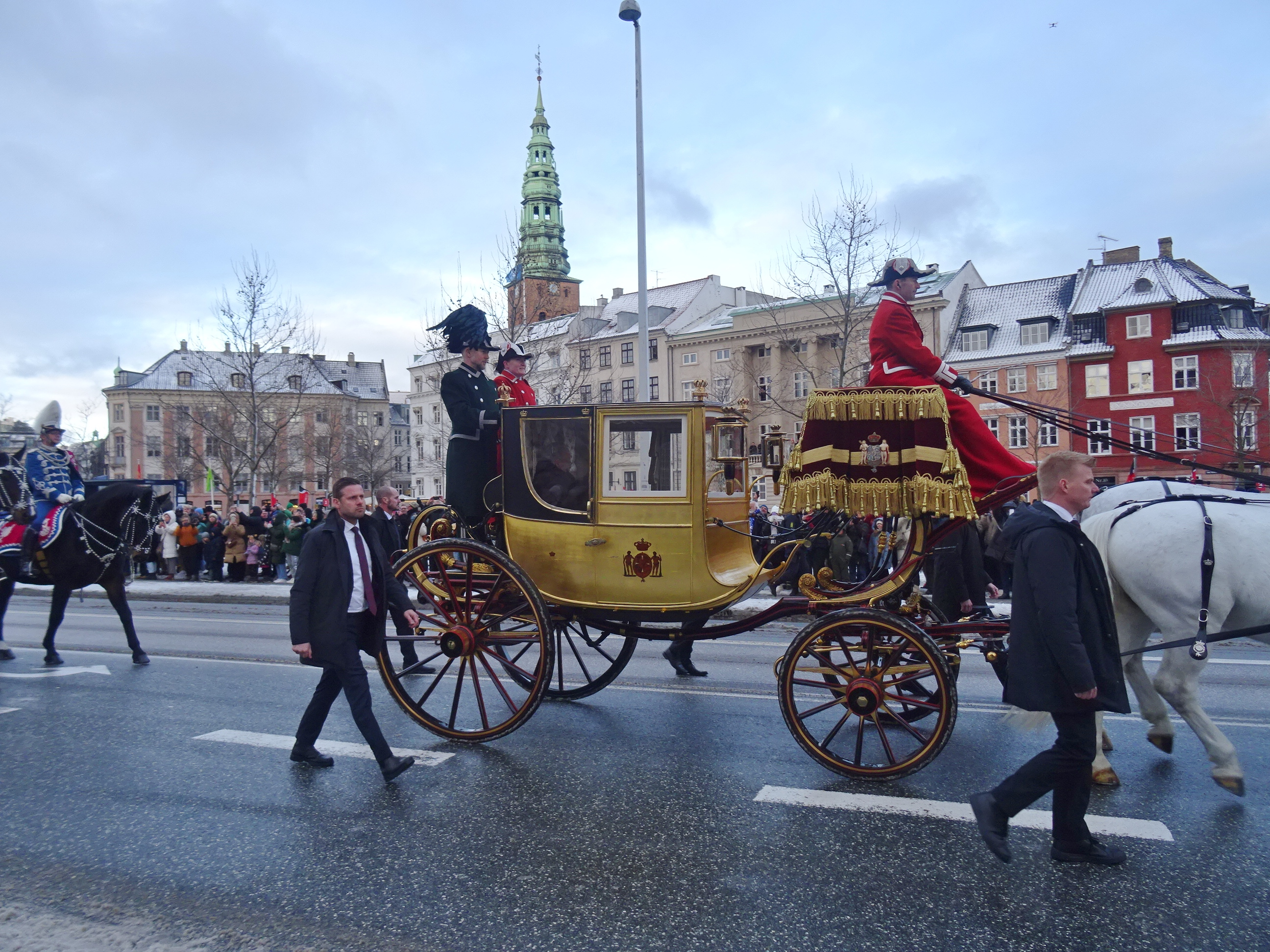
The Golden Coupé with Queen Margrethe II after her last New Year's leave in 2024.

The Golden Coupé is a so-called galla coupé, seating two people. The coach is plated with 24-carat gold leaf, two crowned front lights, four gilded crowns on the roof and painted state coats of arms on the doors. The upholstered interior is lined with cream-coloured silk, richly decorated with Passementerie. The body is suspended in leather strips from C-shaped steel springs, which again rest on horizontal steel springs, securing a relatively comfortable ride. The gilding of the crowns on the roof was renewed by Georg Jensen in 2018.

== Today ==
The Golden Coupé has with few exceptions been used when Magrethe II travels from her residence at Amalienborg Palace to Christiansborg for the annual New Year's levee in January.

When not in use, it is together with a selection of the other royal carriages on display in the Royal Mews and Carriage Museum at Christiansborg.

== See also ==
- List of state coaches
- Gold coach
