= Marstallmuseum =

Museum in Germany

Coordinates: 48°09′21″N 11°30′20″E

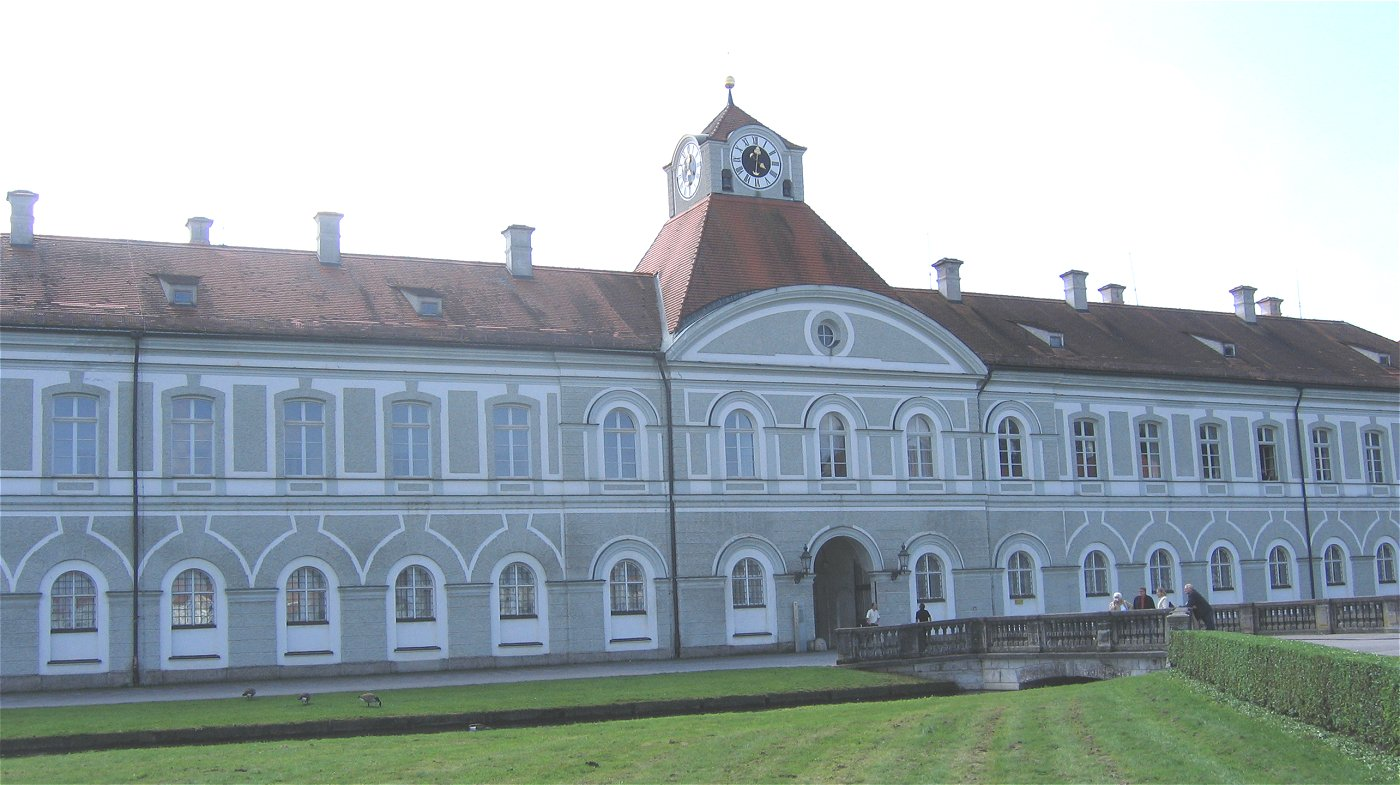
Marstallmuseum Nymphenburg

The Marstallmuseum (museum in the former royal stables) in Munich is one of the most important museums for court carriages in the world. It is located in the South Wing of Nymphenburg Palace. On display is a vehicle park from the time of the Bavarian and Palatine electors and kings of the House of Wittelsbach. The collection gives an extensive overview of the development of the carriages from the end of the 17th century to the end of the 19th century with exhibits from Germany, France and England. There are forty royal and other representative coaches, barouches, sledges, litters and even a carousel.

== History ==
The rich holdings of the Wittelsbach were already exhibited in the first half of the 19th century just like at the Viennese Court. At the end of the Monarchy in 1918, the vehicle stock was about 300, some of which were no longer fit for driving. Lastly, cars were also managed by Marstall.

After the end of the monarchy, the remaining high-quality exhibits were exhibited from 1923 in the former Court Riding School at Marstallplatz. This area east of the Munich Residenz was largely destroyed in 1944 by air raids. Already before 1941, the collection had been transferred to Nymphenburg Palace. Thus, today's Marstallmuseum is located in the rooms of the former court stables in the southern Building of Nymphenburg Palace. It was opened in 1952. In 1986, a refurbishment and new conception took place.

== Exhibition ==
Centrepieces are the splendid chariot of Elector Charles Albert (1726-1745), which he used on the occasion of his coronation as Holy Roman Emperor in 1742 and the two coronation carriages of King Maximilian I Joseph (1799-1825). Built for a private order of King Ludwig II (1864-1886), the five carriages and sledges came into the collection only after his death in 1886. The portrait gallery of his horses, which Ludwig II had made by the painter Friedrich Wilhelm Pfeiffer, is also represented. Less elaborate, but very elegant are the coaches from the time of the Prince Regent Luitpold (1886-1912). Since 2012, the newly restored Hercules sledge of the Bavarian Elector Max Emanuel (1679-1726) and the pompous litter of his first consort, the Austrian princess Maria Antonia have been put on display as well.

Carriage exhibits

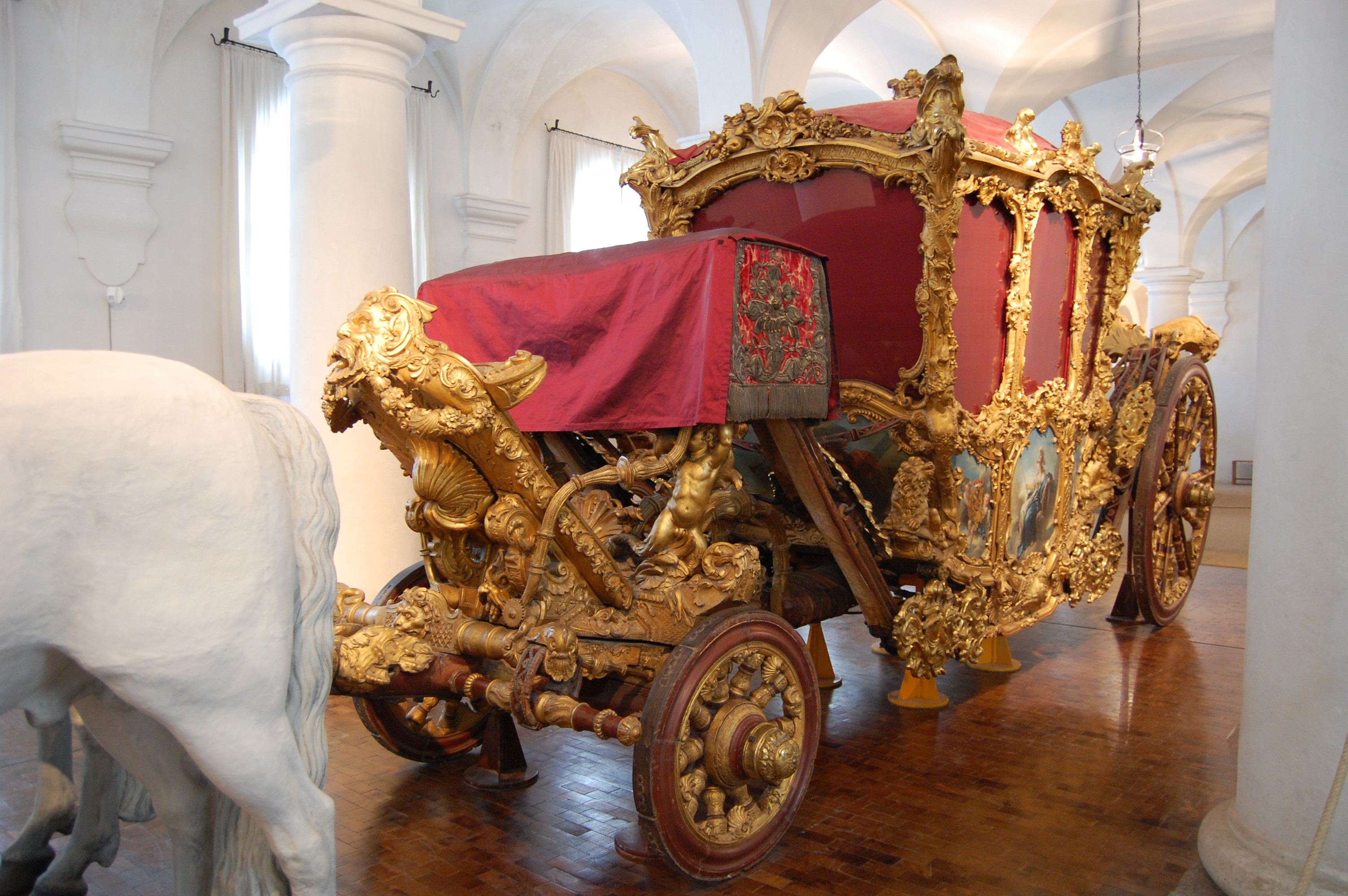
Coronation coach of Emperor Charles VII

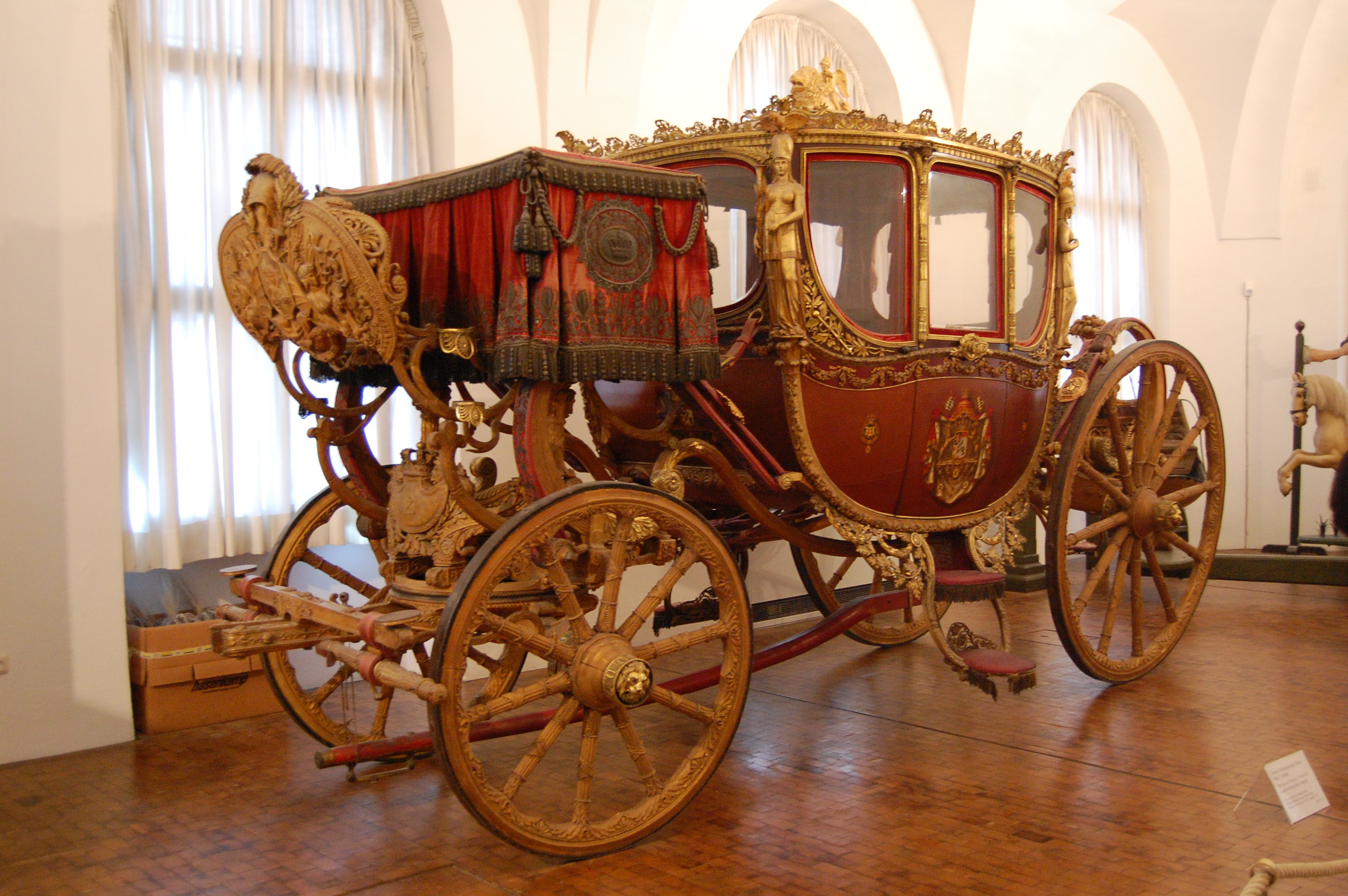
Coach of King Maximilian I Joseph

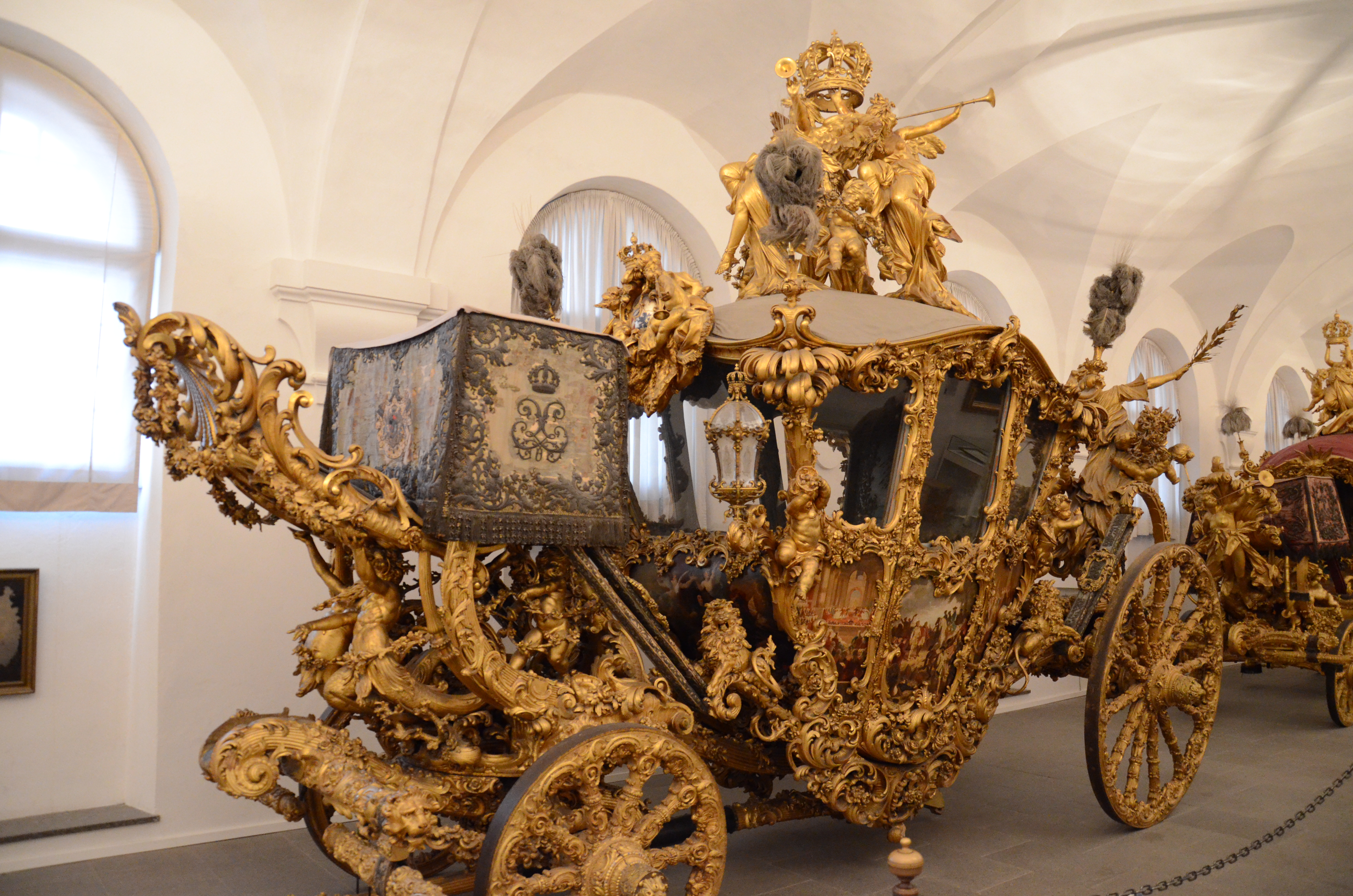
New Dress Coach of King Ludwig II
