= Hammercloth =

Decorative cover for a coachman's seat

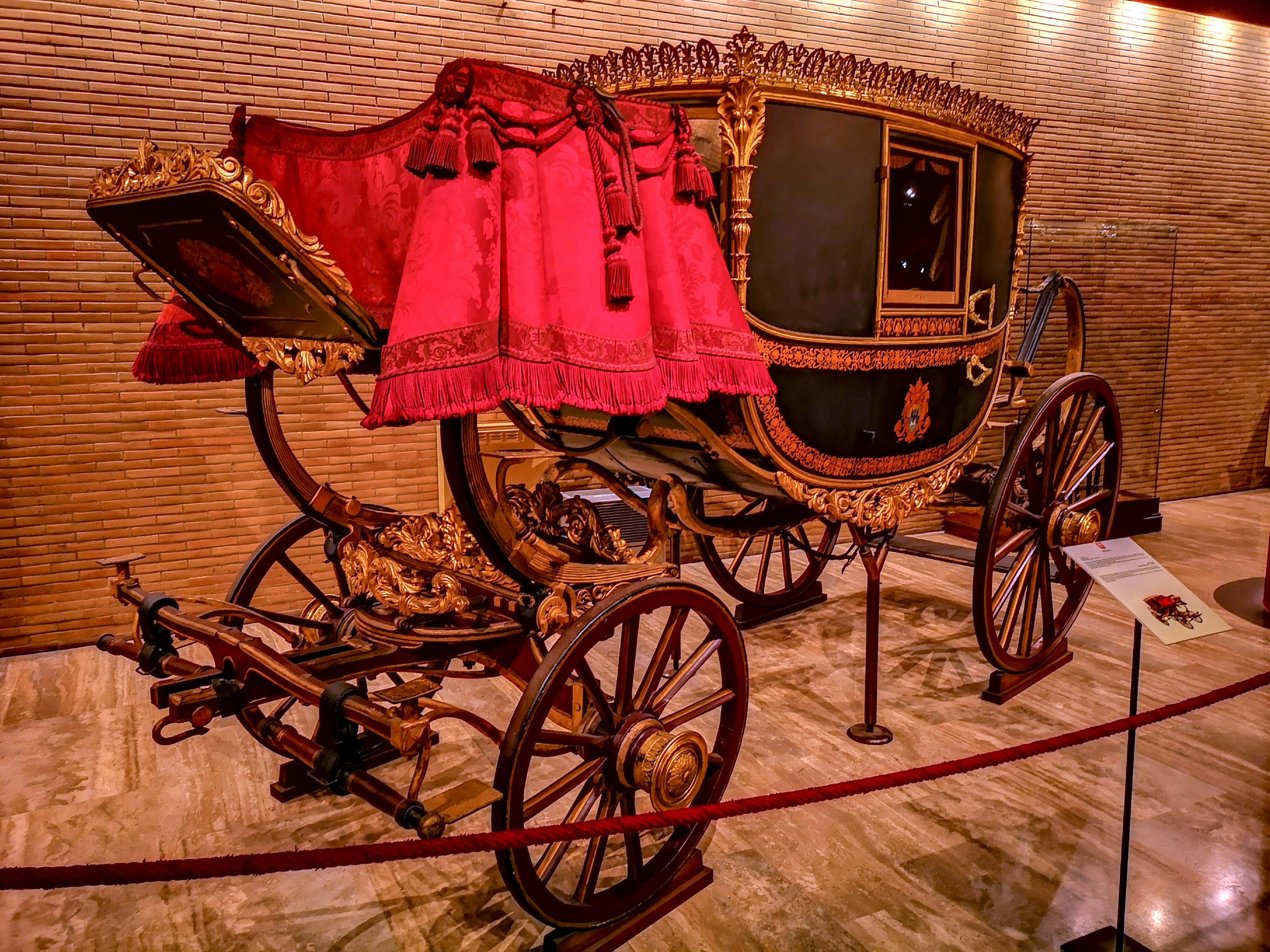
The hammercloth is the red drapery on the coachman's seat of this Gala Berlin

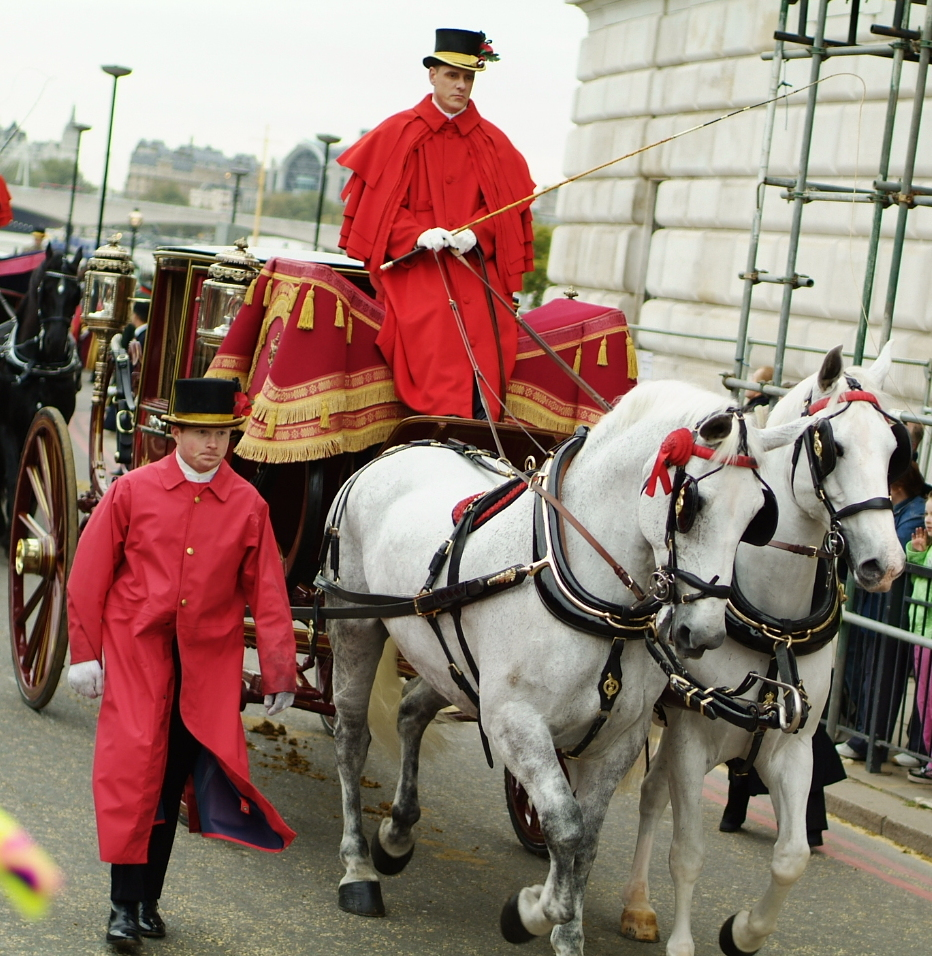
Lord Mayor's Show, London, 2006

A hammercloth is a large decorative piece of heavy weatherproof fabric, often fringed and richly adorned with embroidery, gemstones, and cloth of gold, placed over and around the seat of the coachman of a carriage or coach. A hammercloth might display the arms or other emblems of the heritage of the owner of the coach.

== Origin ==
The origin of the word hammercloth is uncertain, and several etymologies have been given. One is that a coachman used to carry his tools, including a hammer, with him underneath his seat to perform repairs to a carriage should it break down on the road. Another is that the "hammer" portion is a corruption of the word "hamper", and meant to suggest that the cloth covered a hamper which might contain food for the passengers or coachman. A third is that it is a corruption of "hammock", and that a "hammock-cloth" was a strip of fabric used instead of a wooden seat in days before carriages had springs for shock absorption. On a carriage with no springs, a hammock provides a much more comfortable ride than a wooden slat, and so "hammock-cloth" may have been the original term.
