= State Coach (disambiguation) =

A state coach is a highly ornamented heavy carriage for state, royal or ceremonial occasions.

State Coach may refer to:

- Australian State Coach
- Diamond Jubilee State Coach
- Gold State Coach
- Irish State Coach
- Lord Mayor of London's State Coach
- Queen Alexandra's State Coach
- Scottish State Coach
- Speaker's State Coach
