= Frecklington =

Frecklington is a surname. Notable people with the surname include:

- Deb Frecklington (born 1971), Australian politician, member of the Legislative Assembly of Queensland
- Lee Frecklington (born 1985), former professional footballer
- W. J. Frecklington (born 1949), Australian maker of carriages

== See also ==
- Eckington (disambiguation)
