= Pergolesi (disambiguation) =

Giovanni Battista Pergolesi (1710–1736) was an Italian composer, violinist and organist.

Pergolesi may also refer to:

- Michael Angelo Pergolesi, 18th-century Italian decorative artist
- Pergolesi (film), a 1932 historical musical film by Guido Brignone
- 7622 Pergolesi, a main-belt asteroid

== See also ==
- Pergolese
- Pergolizzi
