= Speaker's State Coach =

Horse-drawn coach used by the British Speaker of the House of Commons

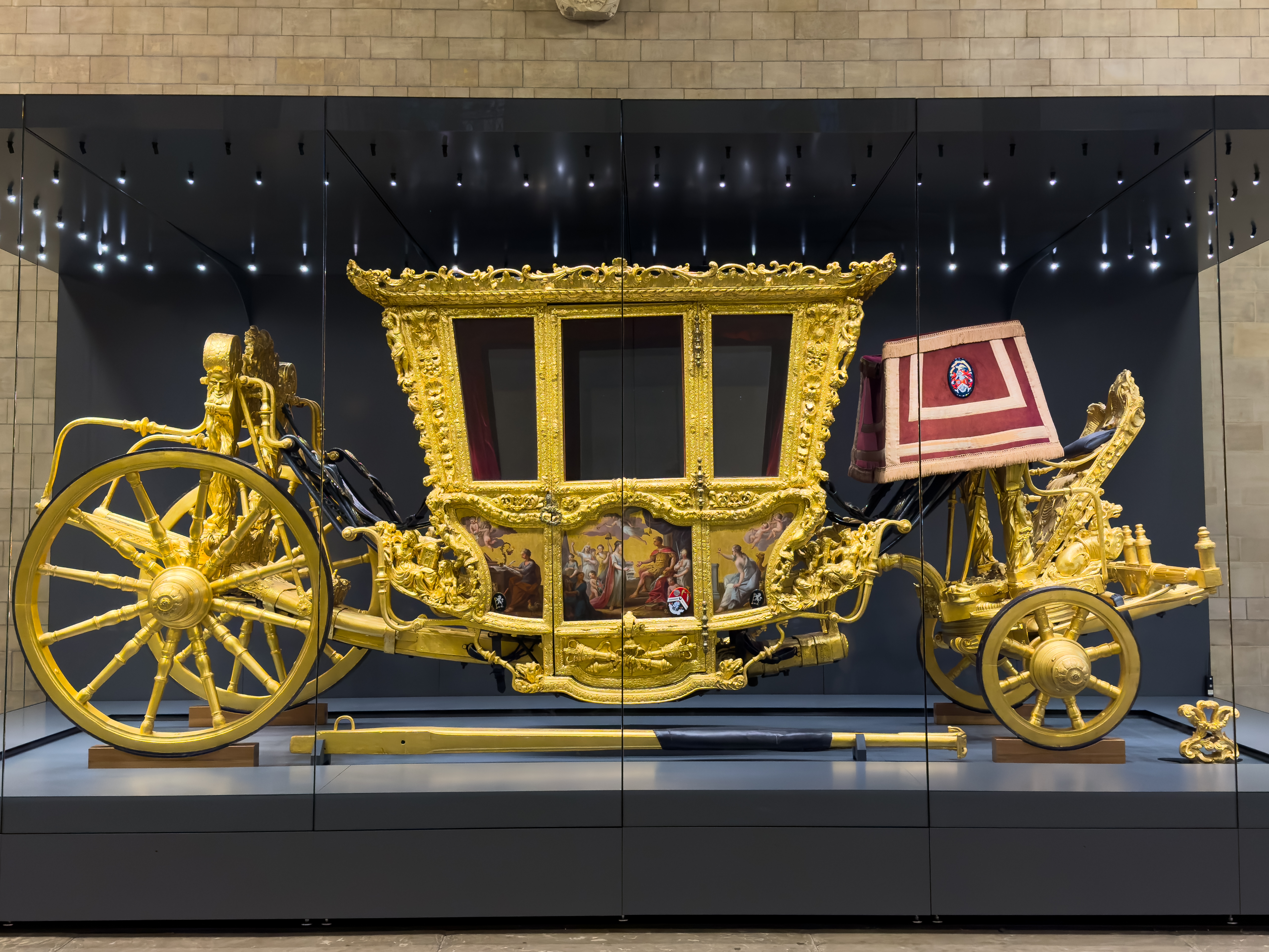
Speaker's State Coach (2023)

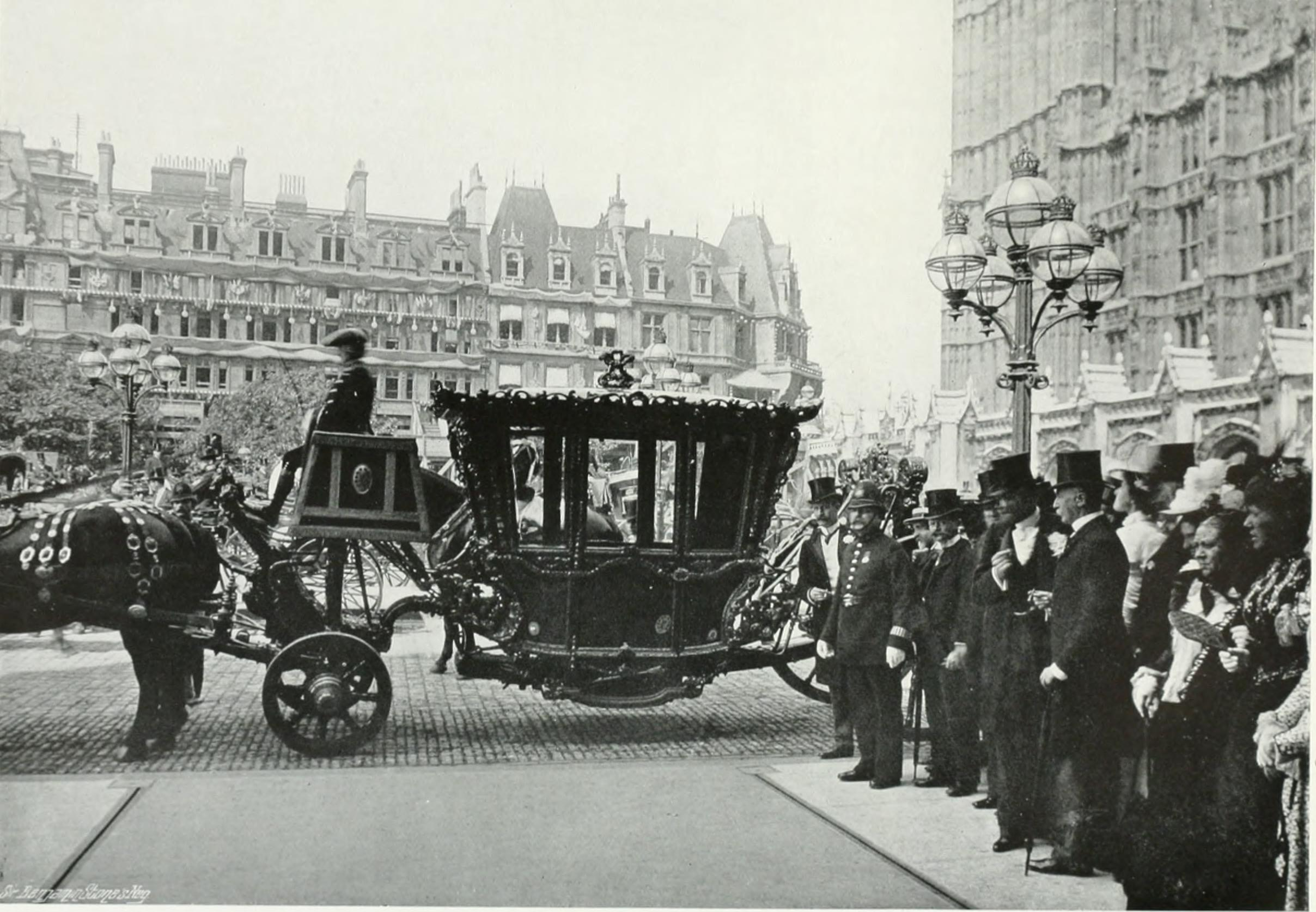
The coach awaiting Mr Speaker Gully, on the occasion of Queen Victoria's Diamond Jubilee in 1897

The Speaker's State Coach, built in 1698, is the oldest of the state coaches of the United Kingdom. It is decorated with elaborate gilded carvings and allegorical paintings by Giovanni Cipriani. The coach was originally designed for King William III by Daniel Marot. Around 1702, William's successor, Queen Anne, gifted it to the Speaker of the House of Commons. It has been used in processions on state occasions such as coronations and jubilees, when the Speaker would ride the short journey from the Palace of Westminster to Westminster Abbey before the service, and then in the carriage procession following the service. The coach was retired from use in 2005, extensively restored, and remains on display for the public as a historical work of art with the Parliamentary Art Collection.

== Description ==
Built in 1698, this state coach is one of the oldest in Europe, and is oldest of the three gilded state coaches of the UK — the others are the Lord Mayor of London's State Coach (1757) and the Gold State Coach (1762). The coach weighs 2.7 tonnes and has no brakes. The coach is 6.44 metres long, 2m wide, and 2.9m high.

The coach is built in the Baroque style with gilded carved figurines and illustrated panels. The symbolism of the paintings demonstrate that the coach had been associated with the speakership from a very early time.

The lower panels are painted with emblematic subjects. One door panel has a seated figure of Britannia to whom women are bringing fruits; the offside door panel shows King William seated, with Liberty, Fame and Justice (blindfolded) beside him being presented with two scrolls — one inscribed 'Magna Carta' and the other 'Bill of Rights'. Beneath each door panel are crossed maces surmounted by a cup. The four side panels show figures of Literature, Science, Plenty and Architecture. The back panel probably refers to the coming of William and Mary to England, with a ship in the background, William and Mary on the left and Britannia with a lion on the right. The paintings are by Cipriani. ... The crests of the speakers who have used the coach are inscribed on the panels.

— Bryan H. Fell

Carvings: The body of the coach is supported by 'naval and military figures', and the coachman's box rests on two large figures of Plenty, and the footboard on a pair of lions.

In 2006–2008, the coach underwent a two-year conservation effort by Plowden & Smith where it was cleaned, treated for pests, excess gilding and varnishes were removed, and the structure stabilized. The carriage is part of the Parliamentary Art Collection.

== Known processions ==
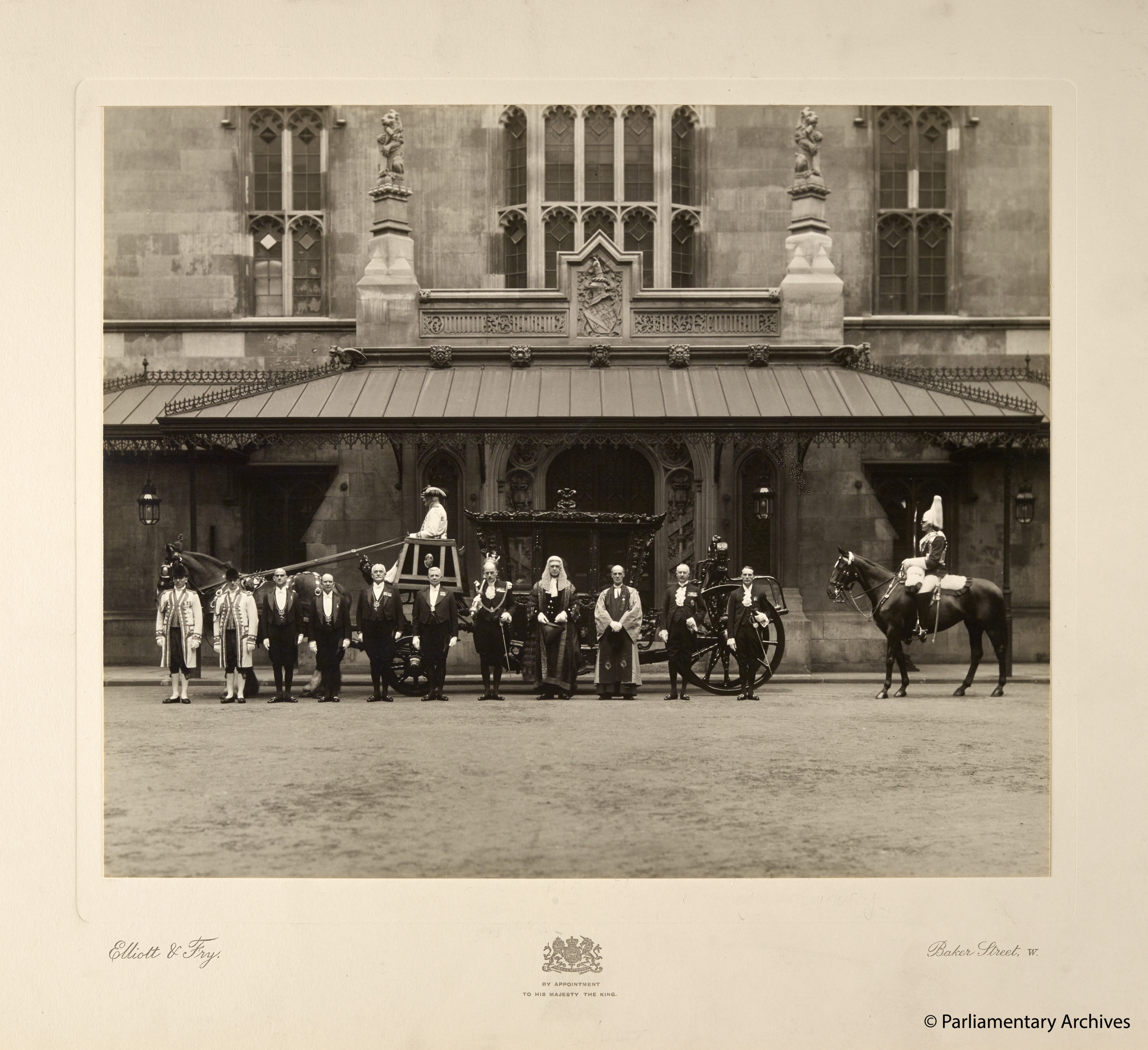
The coach, together with its occupants and attendants, prior to the Coronation in 1937.

Before the coach was retired from use in 2005, it was known to have been used in processions on the following occasions:

- 1872, National service of thanksgiving, celebrating the recovery of Albert Edward, Prince of Wales from typhoid fever
- 1897, Diamond Jubilee of Queen Victoria (Note: Fell's book incorrectly dates this as 1879)
- 1902, Coronation of Edward VII
- 1911, Coronation of George V
- 1935, Silver Jubilee of George V
- 1937, Coronation of George VI
- 1953, Coronation of Elizabeth II
- 1977, Silver Jubilee of Elizabeth II
- 1981, Wedding of Charles, Prince of Wales and Lady Diana Spencer

On state occasions such as these, the speaker is accompanied in the coach by his usual retinue of Secretary, Chaplain and Serjeant-at-Arms, together with the House of Commons Mace, which is positioned to be clearly visible from outside. The Speaker's Train-bearer is also accommodated, on a stool in the centre.

A coachman and two footmen are employed, wearing distinctive livery, and the Speaker is escorted by a single Household Cavalryman, who rides alongside the carriage. Since the speakership of Shaw-Lefevre in the 1800s, the coach has been pulled by a pair of Whitbread Shire horses; Shaw-Lefevre having been a partner in Messrs Whitbread & Co.

== Location of the coach ==
Around 1808, the coach was housed in stables adjoining the Speaker's House.

Starting in 1978, the coach was on display at Whitbread's Brewery in Chiswell Street, London EC1. When Whitbread's sold the building, they relinquished their custody of the coach.

Starting in 1995, the coach has occasionally been on display at Westminster Hall.

In 2011, Speaker John Bercow announced that the coach would go on display at the National Trust's Arlington Court Carriage Museum in Devon, where it remained until 2023.

In 2023 it was publicly displayed in Westminster Hall for the occasion of the coronation of King Charles III.

== See also ==
- List of state coaches
