= Pergolizzi =

Pergolizzi (pronounced [perɡoˈlittsi]) is an Italian surname from Sicily, derived from a Pergole place name around Palermo or referring to a family house with pergola elements. Notable people with the surname include:

- Frank Pergolizzi, American college athletic administrator and former American football coach
- Laura Pergolizzi (born 1981), known as LP, American singer, songwriter and musician
- Rosario Pergolizzi (born 1968), Italian football coach and former player
- Vanessa Trump (née Pergolizzi; born 1977), American model

== See also ==
- Pergolesi (disambiguation)
- Pergoliti
