= Lord Mayor of London's State Coach =

Ceremonial coach

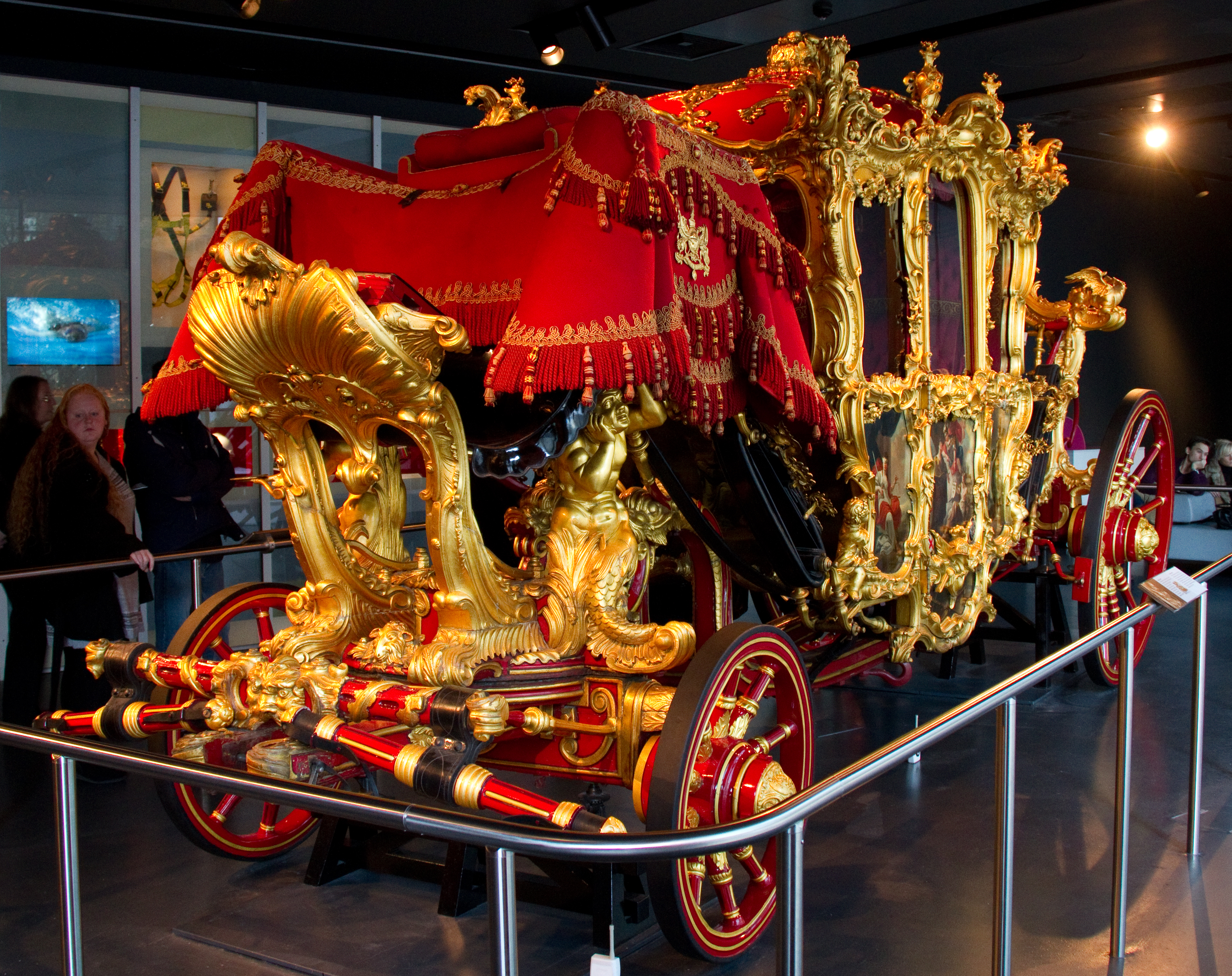
The coach on display in the Museum of London

The Lord Mayor of London's State Coach is, along with the King's Gold State Coach and the Speaker's State Coach, one of the three great state coaches of the United Kingdom. Unlike the other two (which are only used on rare occasions such as Coronations) the Lord Mayor's Coach is used annually at the Lord Mayor's Show, and as such it is deemed to be the oldest ceremonial vehicle in regular use in the world.

== Details of the design ==
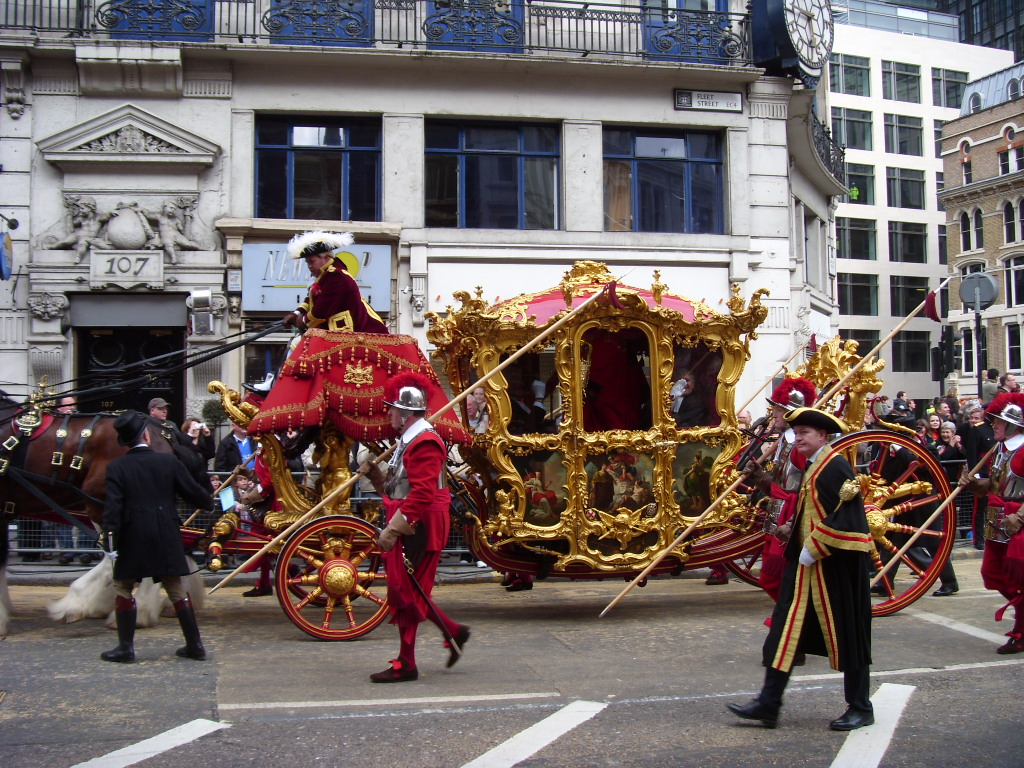
The coach in use at the Lord Mayor's Show (2007)

The carriage is of the type known as a Berlin. It is constructed substantially of wood, which is richly carved, ornamented and gilded. The body of the coach is attached to the undercarriage by four thick leather straps, each held in place by a huge, intricately decorated gilt buckle featuring the City's coat of arms. The roof of the coach is red painted with gilded ornamentation; there was formerly a central carved feature (depicting four boys holding baskets of fruit) only the base of which now remains. There is a large box seat in front for the coachman, whose foot-rest is in the shape of a scallop shell. The Lord Mayor's Coach has undergone a number of programs of restorations.

On all four sides of the coach there are painted panels attributed to renowned carriage painter Giovanni Cipriani. Each shows an allegorical scene:

- The front panel shows figures representing Faith, Hope and Charity (Hope is shown pointing towards the dome of St Paul's Cathedral).
- The rear panels depict a figure representing the City of London receiving gifts from Riches and Plenty, Trade and Commerce.
- The right-hand panels include a Mayor being presented to the figure of the City, with the spire of Old St Paul's Cathedral in the background.
- The left-hand panels include the god Mars pointing to a scroll held by Truth on which is inscribed the name of the first Mayor, Henri Fitz Alwin. The ceiling of coach has twice been painted blue, rather than the current red, and the Museum of London estimates there to be approximately 100 different layers of paint.

Today, the carriage is supported by Kevlar bands, although they are disguised by more traditional-looking leather straps.

The carriage measures 6.55 m (21.5 ft) in length and 2.23 m (7.3 ft) in width, with a height of 3.17 m (10.4 ft). The coach weighs 2.9 tonnes.

== History ==
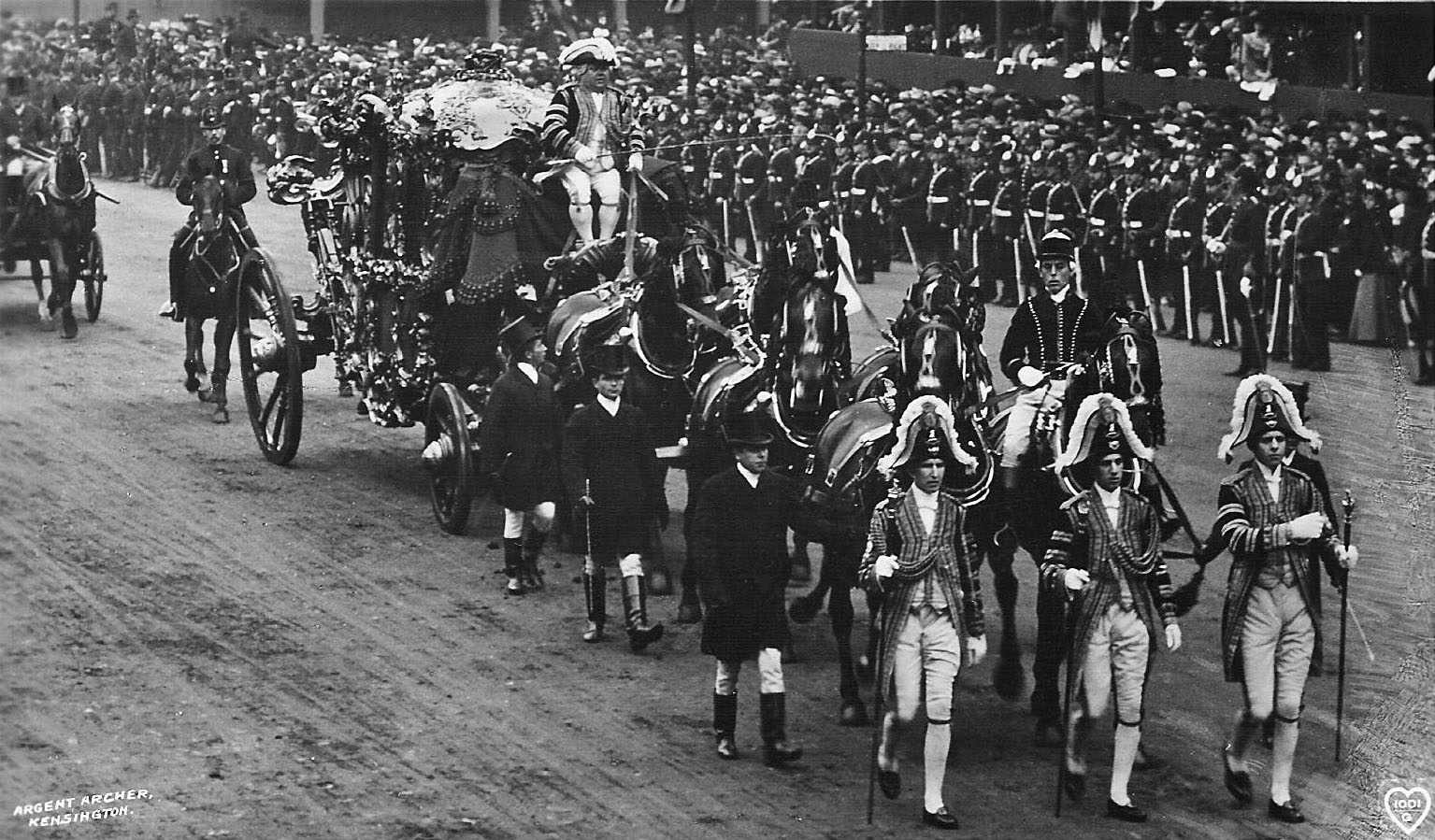
The coach being used to convey Sir Marcus Samuel to the Coronation of Edward VII in 1902

From 1711 the Lord Mayor was transported around the city using a hired coach, following an incident in which the incumbent, Gilbert Heathcote, was unseated from his horse by a drunken flower girl in 1710, breaking his leg. This arrangement continued until 1757, when city banker and Lord Mayor elect, Sir Charles Asgill, persuaded the aldermen to finance the purchase of a "new Grand State Coach". The coach was commissioned on 4 April 1757 and completed in good time for Asgill's inauguration on 9 November that year. It was constructed by Joseph Berry, of Leather Lane, Holborn, at a total cost of £850. It was designed by sculptor and architect Sir Robert Taylor, who had previously worked on private commissions for Asgill, and also designed the pediment fronting the Mansion House.

Since then, the coach has been used regularly, generally once a year, by successive Lord Mayors. It has been more or less regularly maintained over two and a half centuries of use, and periodically regilded. The last major overhaul was in 1952, when the carriage was entirely stripped down and cleaned, with parts repaired or replaced where necessary and the wood preserved and strengthened, before being regilded, revarnished, reupholstered, and reassembled. Overall, though, changes to the original design have been minimal: an interior lamp was added in 1939, and brakes were only installed in 1951.

== Present-day use ==
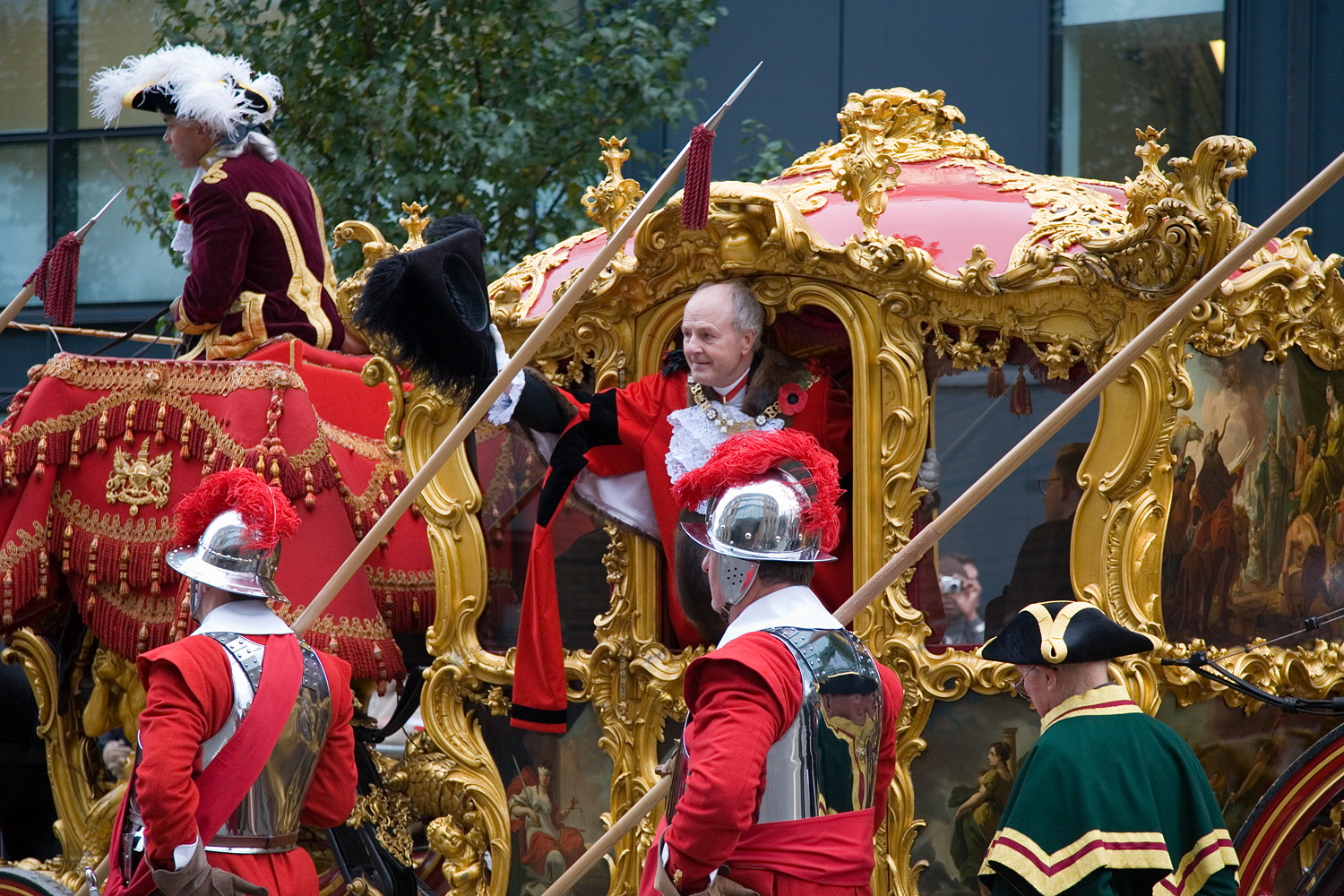
Lord Mayor's Show 2006

Each November, the coach is used to convey the new Lord Mayor from the Mansion House to the Royal Courts of Justice, where they then swear allegiance to The Crown, travelling at the rear of the long procession that constitutes the Lord Mayor's Show. The coach is pulled by a team of six shire horses, with the front pair being ridden by a postillion and the other two pairs driven by a coachman from the box seat.

When not in use, the coach is kept at the Museum of London but is currently not on display. In advance of the Show, it is moved to a temporary glass carriage house outside the Guildhall, where passers-by can see it being made ready for the procession.

The State Harness and the City Marshal's Saddlery are kept in the Park Street Coach House with the other carriages of the Corporation.

== Other carriages of the Corporation of London ==
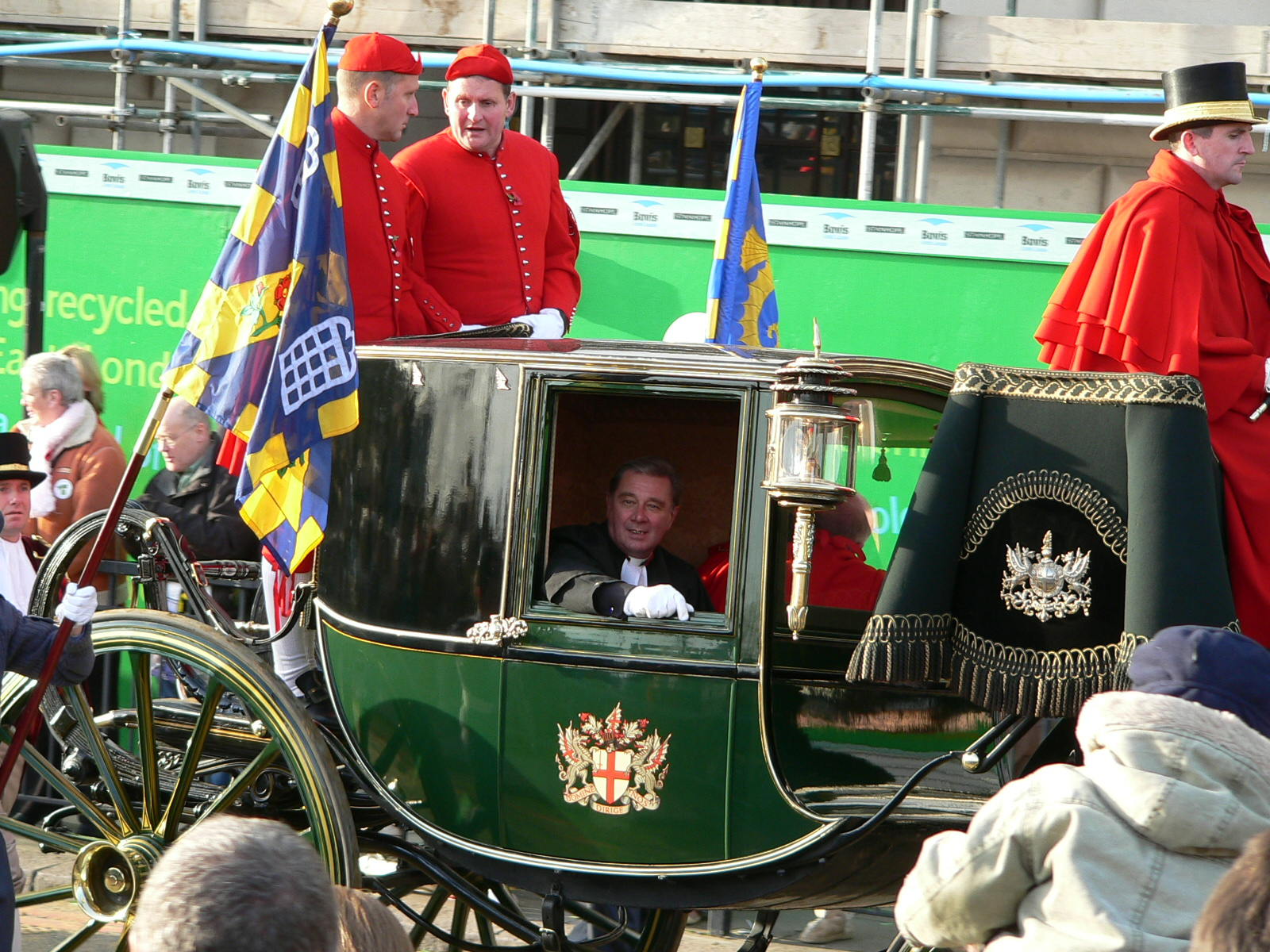
Dress chariot

The Corporation owns six other 'semi-state' carriages (two semi-state coaches and four dress chariots) four of which are also used in the Lord Mayor's Show. They are used to transport other senior dignitaries of the Corporation: the Chief Commoner and the Secondary, the Lay Sheriff, the Aldermanic Sheriff and the outgoing Lord Mayor and Chaplain.

They are elegant carriages with plain black painted roofs and the bodies either maroon, green or blue; each has the City arms painted on its doors. In 2010 the Corporation attempted to sell two of these carriages to raise funds, but failed to attract the desired amount of money and they remain available for standby.

== Horses ==
Aside from the six shire horses drawing the state coach which are provided by Waldburg Shires of Huntingdon the horses and attendants used in the Lord Mayor's Show are provided on a 'grace and favour' arrangement by the Royal Mews which also provides other carriages where required.

== See also ==
- List of state coaches
