= Australian State Coach =

Horse-drawn carriage used by the British Royal Family

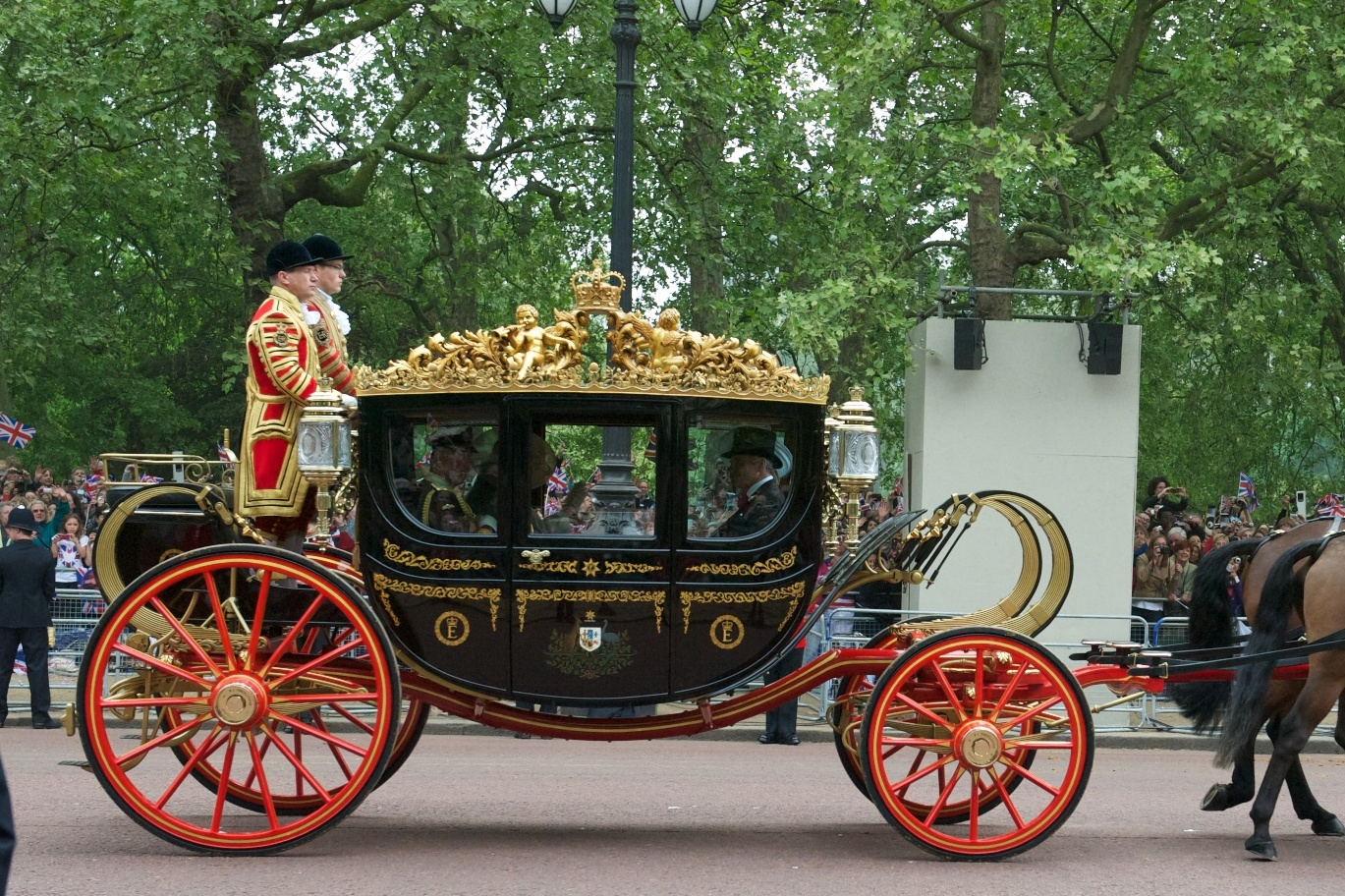
- Artist: W. J. Frecklington (coach builder)
- Completion date: 1988
- Type: Berlin-style coach
- Dimensions: 3.0 m × 6.1 m (10 ft × 20 ft)
- Weight: 2.75 tons
- Condition: in use
- Location: Royal Mews; London, UK
- Owner: The Crown

The Australian State Coach is an enclosed, six horse-drawn coach used by the British royal family. Constructed in 1986-88, it was the first royal state coach to have been built since 1902. It was presented to Queen Elizabeth II in Canberra on 8 May 1988, as the official gift on the occasion of the Australian Bicentennial, and was first used in November of that year by the Queen at the State Opening of Parliament in the UK.

This state coach was a gift to the Queen from the Australian people and was designed and built by the coach builder W. J. Frecklington (who subsequently built the Diamond Jubilee State Coach for Queen Elizabeth II as a private initiative). Apart from the Waterford crystal surrounding the lamps and the blue silk brocaded upholstery (which was provided by the royal household), the coach was entirely constructed using best-quality Australian materials. The Australian State Coach is usually kept at the Royal Mews, where it can be viewed by the public.

== Modern use ==
The Australian State Coach was often used to convey Queen Elizabeth II to and from the State Opening of Parliament. As one of the most modern of the royal coaches it is fitted with electric windows, heating and hydraulic stabilisers; it is therefore regularly used for state and ceremonial occasions.

The Australian State Coach was used to convey Charles, Prince of Wales and Camilla, Duchess of Cornwall together with parents of Catherine, Duchess of Cambridge, Michael and Carole Middleton, from Westminster Abbey to Buckingham Palace following the wedding of Prince William and Catherine Middleton on 29 April 2011.

On 5 June 2012, the Australian State Coach was, in case of rain, to be an alternative for the procession from Westminster Hall to Buckingham Palace for Queen Elizabeth II's Diamond Jubilee. However, it was decided that the weather was fit enough for the open-top 1902 State Landau to be used to carry the Queen, the Prince of Wales (later King Charles III) and the Duchess of Cornwall (later Queen Camilla).

On 6 May 2023, the Australian State Coach was used to transport William, Prince of Wales, Catherine, Princess of Wales and their children Prince George, Princess Charlotte and Prince Louis of Wales from Westminster Abbey to Buckingham Palace following the coronation of King Charles III and Queen Camilla.

Details of the coach

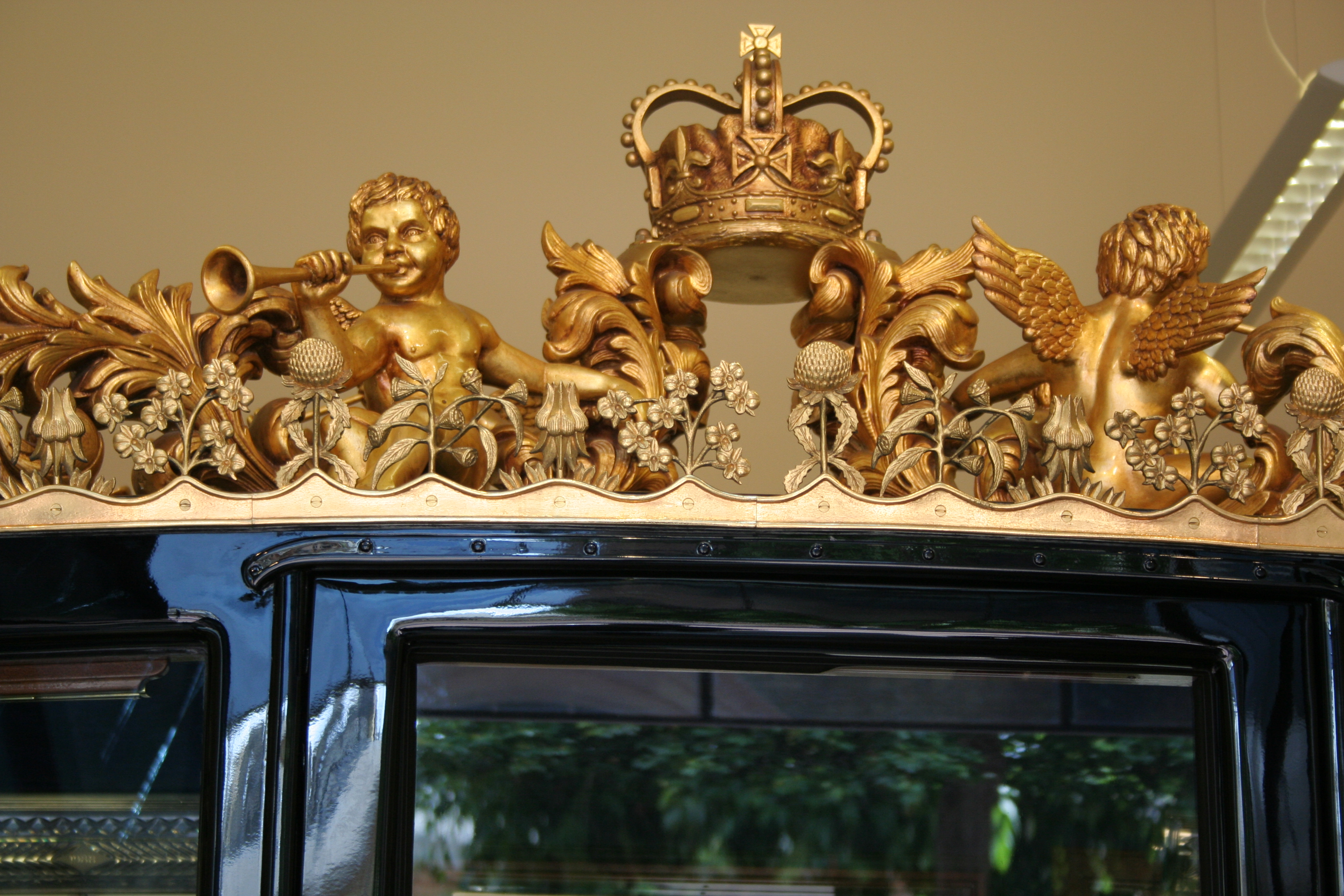
Gilded sculptures and ornamentation on the coach roof

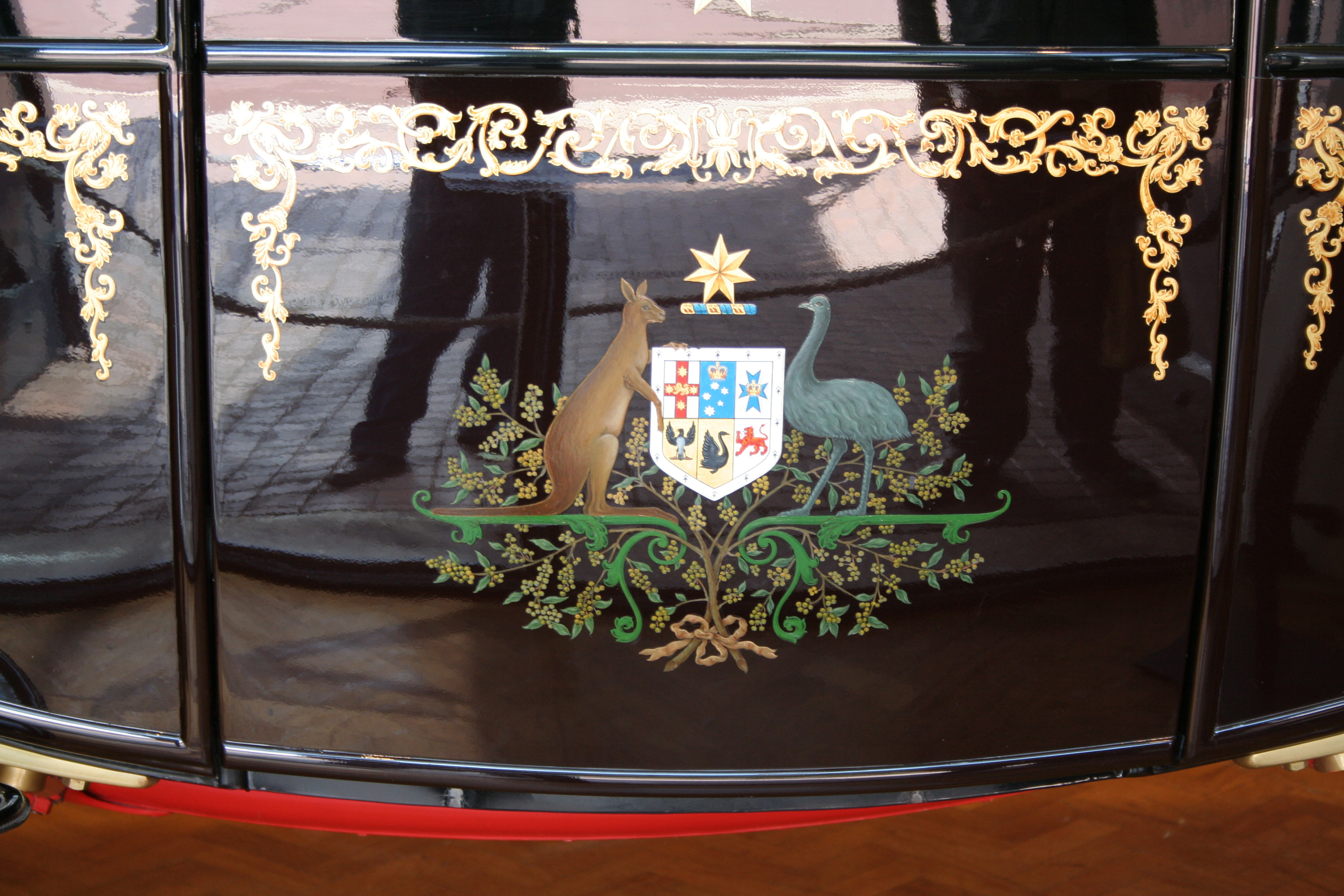
Australia coat of arms emblem on coach door

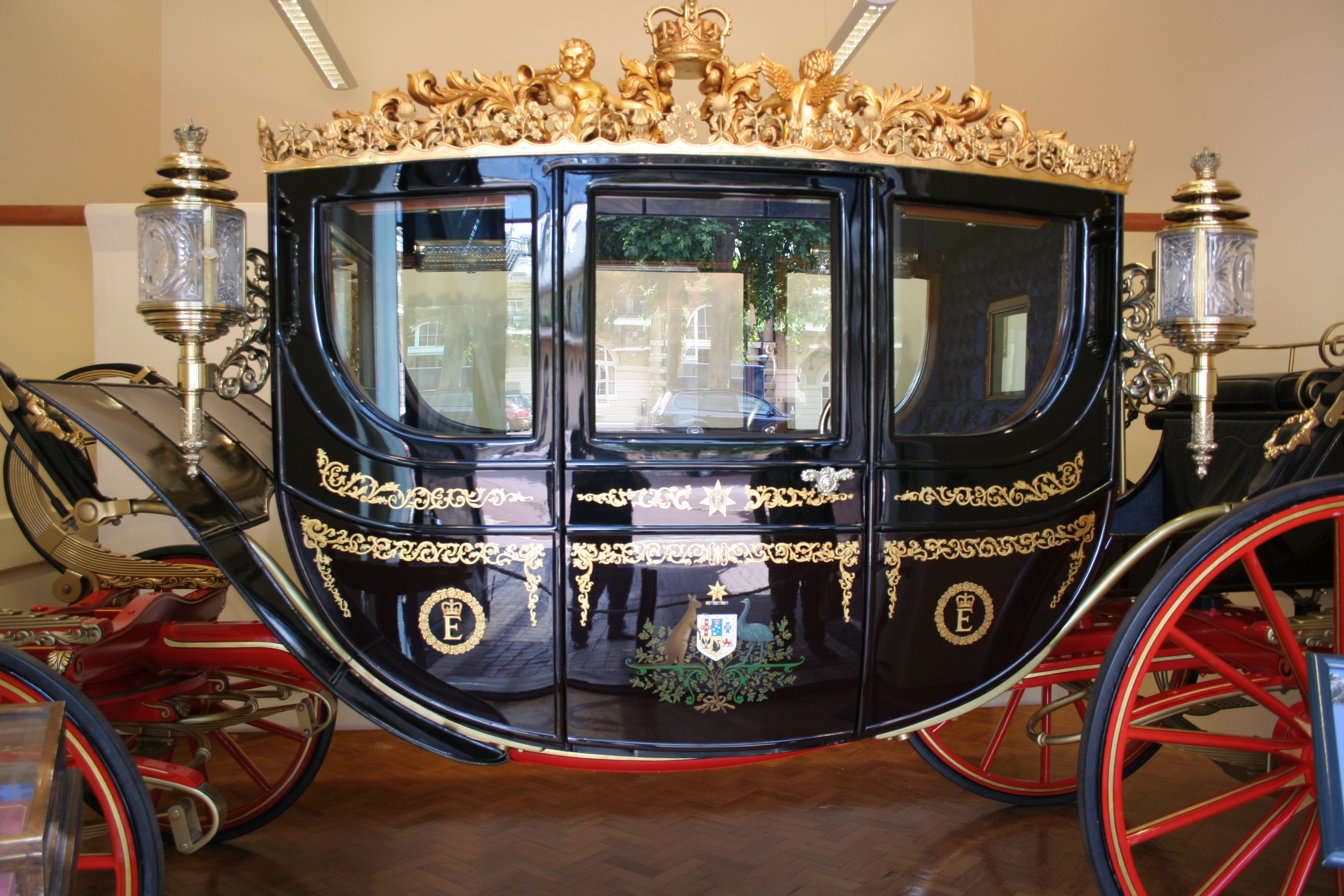
Gilt ornamentation, Waterford Crystal lamps, high gloss finish

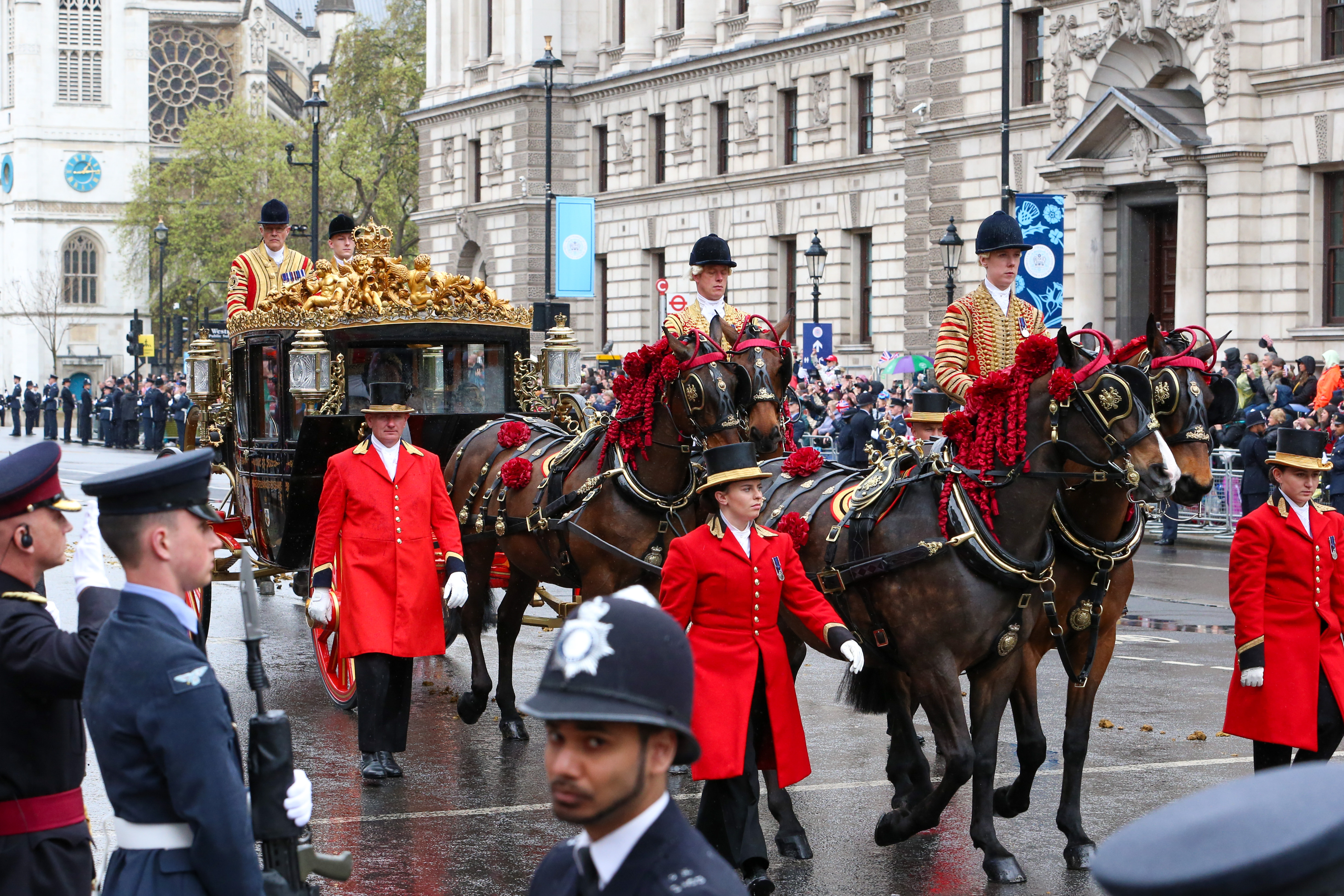
Placement and attire of postilion and attendants

== See also ==
- List of state coaches
