= Michael Angelo Pergolesi =

Italian artist

Michael Angelo Pergolesi (Italian: Michelangelo Pergolesi [mikeˈlandʒelo perɡoˈleːzi, -eːsi]) was an Italian decorative artist from the 18th century who worked mainly in England.

== Biography ==
Biographical details are almost entirely lacking, but like Cipriani he was brought, or attracted, to England by Robert Adam after his famous continental tour. He worked so extensively for the Adams', and his designs are so closely typical of much upon which their reputation rests, that it is impossible to doubt his influence upon their style. His range, like theirs, was catholic. He designed furniture, mantelpieces, ceilings, chandeliers, doors and mural ornament with equal felicity, and as an artist in plaster work in low relief he was unapproached in his day.

He delighted in urns and sphinxes and interlaced gryphons, in amorini with bows and torches, in trophies of musical instruments and martial weapons, and in flowering arabesques which were always graceful if sometimes rather thin. The centre panels of his walls and ceilings were often occupied by classical and pastoral subjects painted by Cipriani, Angelica Kauffman or her husband Antonio Zucchi, and sometimes by himself. These nymphs and amorini, with their disengaged and riant air and classic grace, were not infrequently used as copies for painting upon that satinwood furniture of the last quarter of the 18th century which has never been surpassed for dainty elegance, and for the popularity of which Pergolesi was in large measure responsible; they were even reproduced in marquetry.

Some of this painted work was, apparently, executed by his own hand; most of the pieces attributed to him are remarkable examples of artistic taste and technical skill. His satinwood table-tops, china cabinets and side-tables are the last word in a daintiness which here and there perhaps is mere prettiness.

Pergolesi likewise designed silver plate, and many of his patterns are almost instinctively attributed to the brothers Adam by the makers and purchasers of modern reproductions. There is, moreover, reason to believe that he aided the Adam firm in purely architectural work. In later life Pergolesi appears, like Angelica Kauffman, to have returned to Italy.

Pergolesi wrote Designs for Various Ornaments on Seventy Plates, published between 1777 and 1801.
