= W. J. Frecklington =

Australian carriage maker (1949–2026)

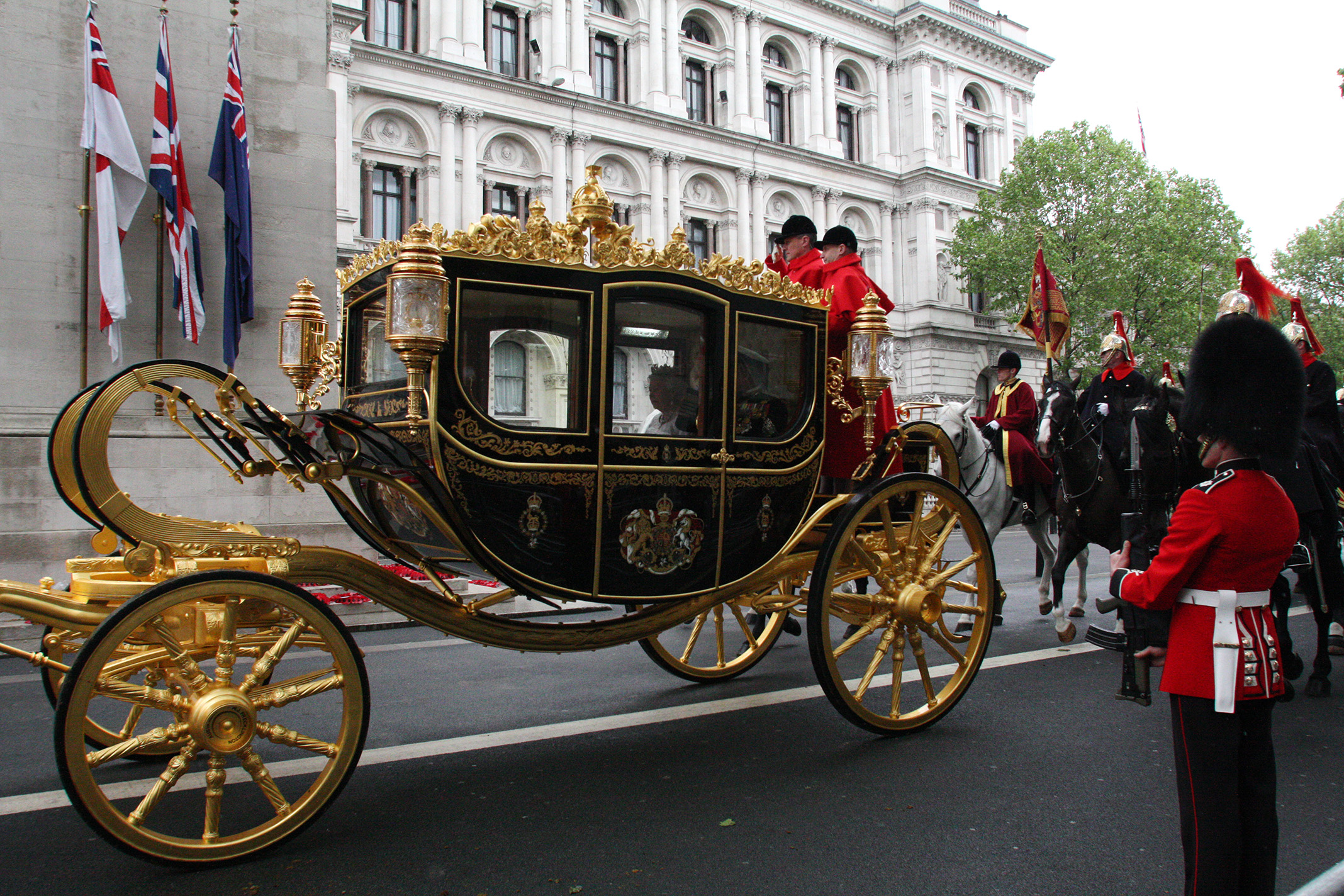
The Diamond Jubilee State Coach, designed and built by Frecklington

William James Frecklington MVO OAM (29 April 1949 – 11 September 2026) was an Australian carriage maker.

== Life and career ==
Frecklington was born in Parkes, New South Wales on 29 April 1949. An old boy of The Scots College in Sydney, he graduated in 1968.

After working in the Arctic, he moved to England and was engaged at Windsor Castle. He later moved to the Royal Mews in London to care for the royal ceremonial horses and driving the carriages on ceremonial occasions. He also served as an outrider of processions at Royal Ascot. In 1977 he was invited to manage the Queen's Silver Jubilee Exhibition during its tour of Australia. Following this he built a replica of Edward VII's 1902 State Landau.

He then went on to build Queen Elizabeth's Australian State Coach, which was presented to the Queen on the occasion of the Australian Bicentennial in 1988.

A new British state coach constructed on Frecklington's initiative, the Diamond Jubilee State Coach (also known as the State Coach Britannia), was first used during the State Opening of Parliament in June 2014. The coach was also used in the coronation of King Charles III.

In April 2023 it was reported that Frecklington was constructing a new coach, but he kept the details secret.

Frecklington died from cancer on 11 September 2026, at the age of 77.

== Decorations ==
- Medal of the Order of Australia
- Member of the Royal Victorian Order
