= Eckington =

Eckington may refer to:

== England ==
- Eckington, Derbyshire
- Eckington, Worcestershire
- Eckington, a former name of the village now called Ripe, East Sussex

== United States ==
- Eckington (Washington, D.C.), a neighborhood of Washington, D.C.

== See also ==
- Heckington
