= Giovanni Battista Cipriani =

Italian painter and engraver in England (1727–1785)

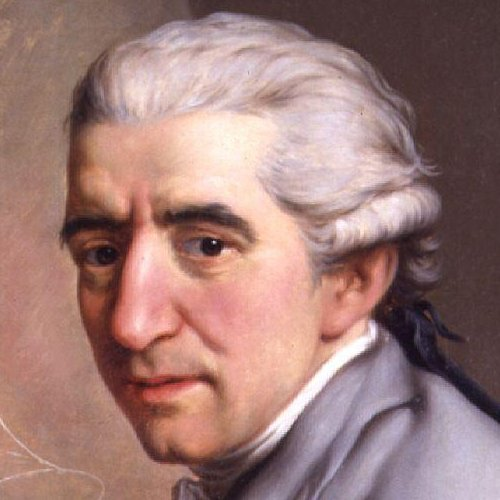
- from a larger painting by John Francis Rigaud.
- Born: 1727; Florence, Grand Duchy of Tuscany
- Died: 14 December 1785 (aged 57–58); Hammersmith, England
- Known for: painting

Giovanni Battista Cipriani RA (1727 – 14 December 1785) was an Italian painter and engraver, who lived in England from 1755. He is also called Giuseppe Cipriani by some authors. Much of his work consisted of designs for prints, many of which were engraved by his friend Francesco Bartolozzi.

== Life ==
Cipriani was born in Florence. His family were originally from Pistoia. He first studied with Ignatius Hugford, a Florentine artist of English descent, and then under Anton Domenico Gabbiani. He spent the years 1750–53 in Rome, where he became acquainted with the architect, Sir William Chambers, and the sculptor, Joseph Wilton whom he accompanied to England in August 1755.

He had already painted two pictures, a St Tesauro and St Peter Igneo for the abbey of San Michele in Pelago, Pistoia, which had brought him a favorable reputation. He also painted one of the canvases of the organ of the church of Santa Maria Maddalena dei Pazzi in Florence and the main altarpiece of the church of the Oratory of Gesù Pellegrino outside of the San Gallo Gate.

On his arrival to England he was patronized by Lord Tilney, Charles Lennox, 3rd Duke of Richmond and other noblemen. When William Chambers designed the Albany in London for Peniston Lamb, 1st Viscount Melbourne, Cipriani painted a ceiling. He also painted part of a ceiling in Buckingham House, and a room with poetical subjects at Standlynch in Wiltshire.

At Somerset House, also built by his friend Chambers, he prepared the decorations for the interior of the north block, including the rooms into which the Royal Academy moved in 1750, which now houses the Courtauld Gallery The central panel of the Royal Academy's ante-room was painted by Sir Joshua Reynolds but the four compartments in the coves, representing Allegory, Fable, Nature and History, were Cipriani's. In the same building he also painted the monochrome decorations in the joint ante-room of the Royal and Antiquarian societies.

According to Joseph Baretti in his Guide through the Royal Academy (1780), "the whole of the carvings in the various fronts of Somerset Place — excepting Bacon's bronze figures — were carved from finished drawings made by Cipriani." These designs include the five masks forming the keystones to the arches on the courtyard side of the vestibule, and the two above the doors leading into the wings of the north block, all believed to have been carved by Joseph Nollekens. The grotesque groups flanking the main doorways on three sides of the quadrangle and the central doorway on the terrace also appear to have been designed by Cipriani.

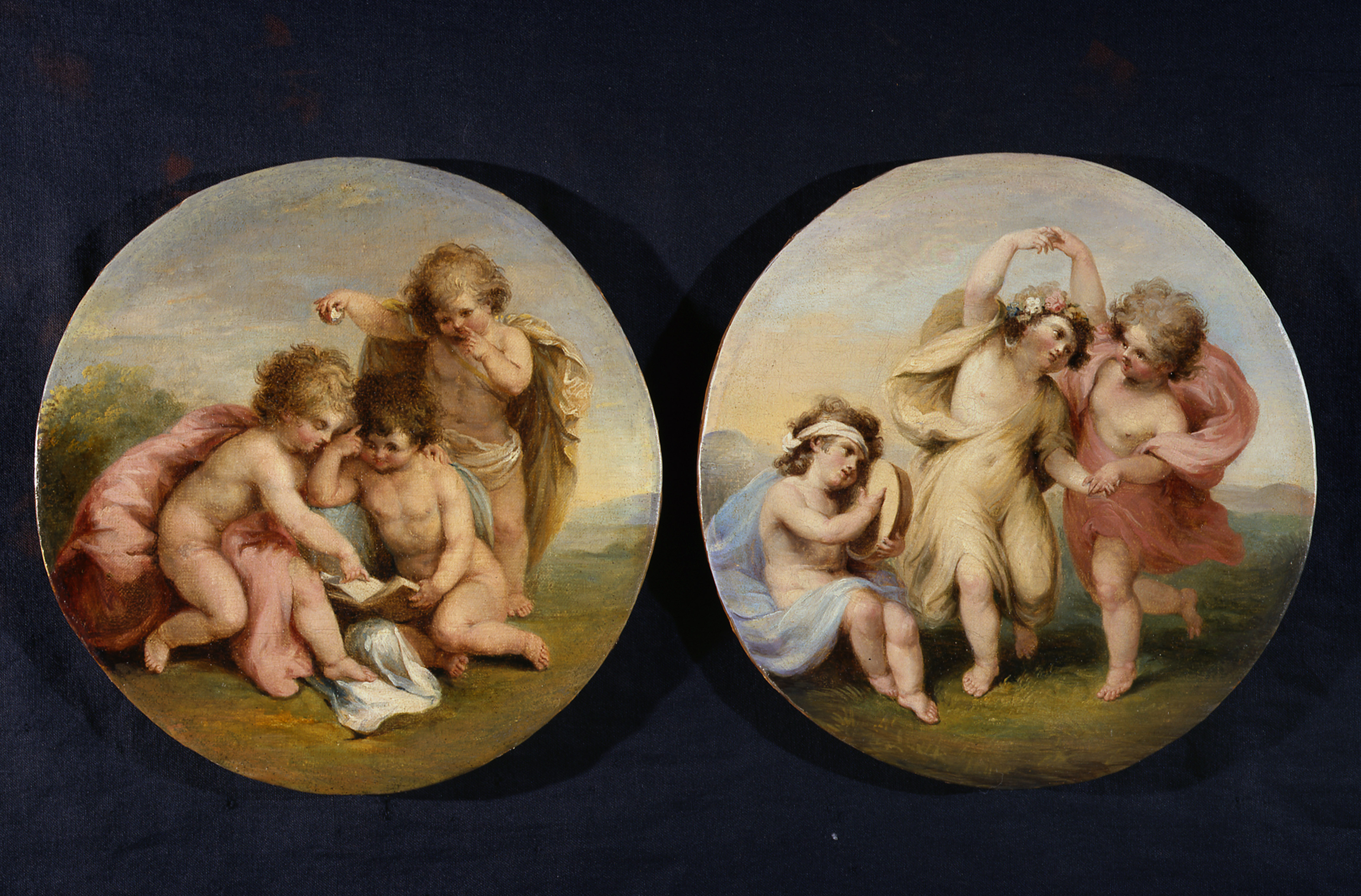
Pair of Tondos with Putti. Oil on canvas, 26,5 cm diameter each. Collezione M (private collection) Rome.

Cipriani was a founder member (1768) of the Royal Academy, and designed its diploma, which was engraved by Francesco Bartolozzi. In recognition of his services in this respect the members presented him with a silver cup with a commemorative inscription in 1769. He was much employed by publishers, for whom he made drawings in pen and ink, sometimes coloured. His friend Bartolozzi engraved most of them. Cipriani made some engravings, including The Death of Cleopatra, after Benvenuto Cellini; The Descent of the Holy Ghost, after Gabbiani; and portraits for Thomas Hollis's memoirs, 1780. He painted allegorical designs for the Gold State Coach and the Lord Mayor of London's State Coach, built in 1762 and 1757 respectively in 1782, and repaired Antonio Verrio's paintings at Windsor and Peter Paul Rubens's ceiling in the Banqueting House at Whitehall.

He also decorated furniture. He designed many groups, of nymphs and amorini and medallion subjects to form the centre of Pergolesi's bands of ornament, and they were continually reproduced upon the elegant satin-wood furniture which was growing popular in his later days and by the end of the 18th century became a rage. These designs were sometimes inlaid in marquetry, but more usually painted onto the wood by other hands. Some of the furniture designed by the Adam Brothers was probably painted by Cipriani himself. He also occasionally designed handles for drawers and doors.

Cipriani died in Hammersmith in west London, and was buried at Dovehouse Green, Chelsea, where Bartolozzi erected a monument to his memory. He had married an Englishwoman, by whom he had two sons.

Among his pupils were John Alexander Gresse (1741–1794); Charles Grignion the Younger (1754–1804); and Mauritius Lowe (1746–1793).
