= Gold State Coach =

Carriage used by the British royal family

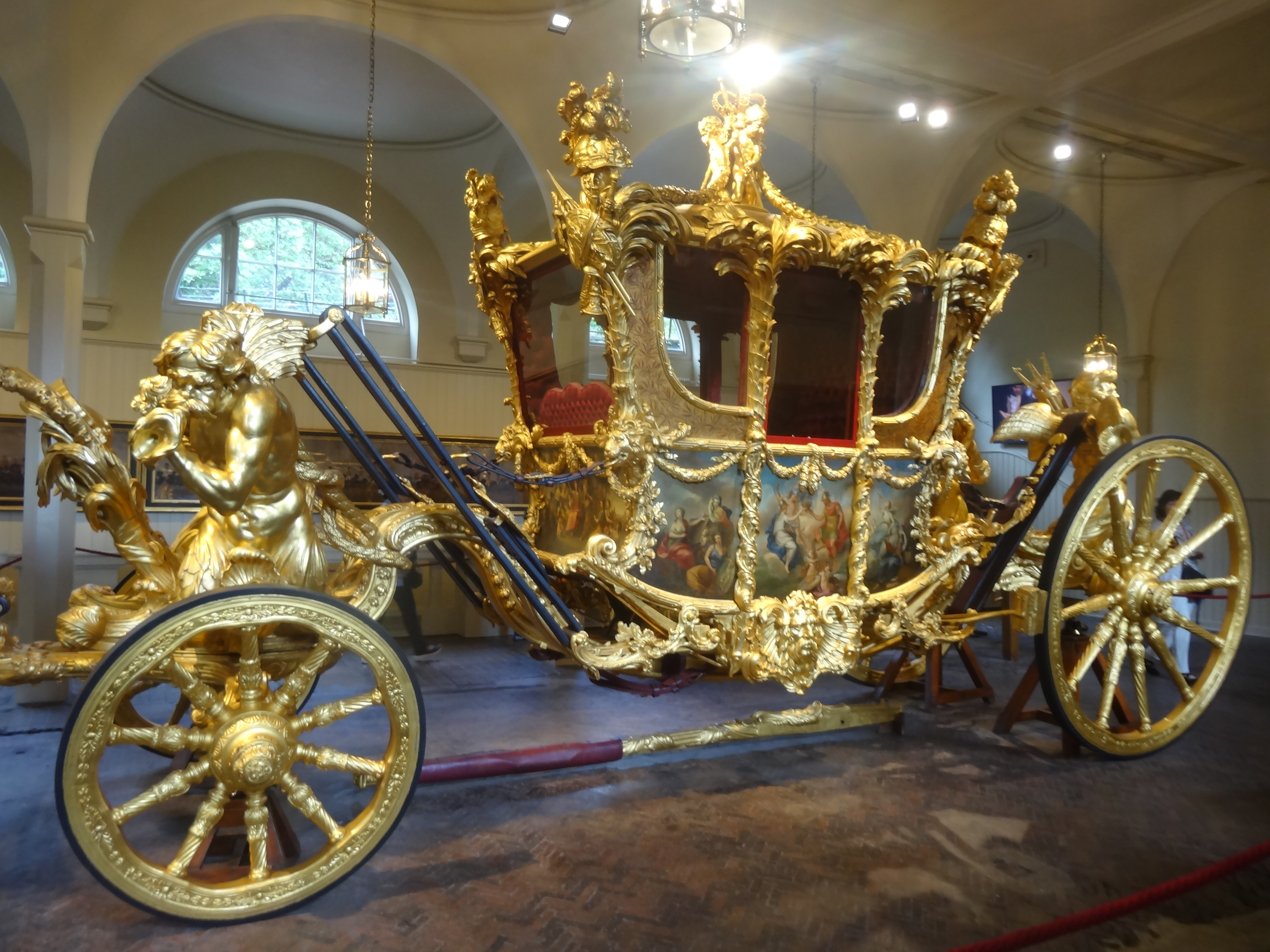
- Artist: Samuel Butler (coachbuilder); Giovanni Battista Cipriani (paintings); Joseph Wilton (scultures)
- Completion date: 1762
- Type: Grande carrosse
- Dimensions: 3.7 m × 2.5 m × 7.6 m (12 ft × 8.2 ft × 25 ft)
- Weight: 4 tonnes (8,800 lb)
- Condition: Conserved. In use.
- Location: Royal Mews
- Owner: The Crown

The Gold State Coach is an enclosed, eight-horse-drawn carriage used by the British royal family. Commissioned in 1760 for King George III, and designed by Sir William Chambers, it was built in the London workshops of Samuel Butler. It was commissioned for £7,562 (£3.54 m or US$4.19 m in 2022, adjusted for inflation). It was built for George III's coronation in 1761, but was not ready in time; it was completed in 1762.

This state coach has been used at the coronation of every British monarch since William IV in 1831. The coach's great age, weight, and lack of manoeuvrability have limited its use to grand state occasions such as coronations and jubilee celebrations. Until the Second World War, the coach was the monarch's usual mode of transport to and from the State Opening of Parliament.

More than 260 years old, it is made of wood covered in gold leaf. The interior is lined with velvet and silk. It is 7.5 metres (25 ft) metres long, 3.6 metres (12 ft) tall, and weighs 4 tonnes (8,800 lb). It was last used at the Coronation of King Charles III and Queen Camilla in 2023. When not in use the coach is housed at the Royal Mews of Buckingham Palace, where it is kept on public display.

== Description ==
The coach weighs 4 tonnes (8,800 lb) and is 7.5 metres (25 ft) metres long and 3.6 metres (12 ft) tall. It is gilded oak and features painted panels by Giovanni Battista Cipriani and rich gilded sculpture. The body of the coach is slung by braces of Morocco leather and decorated with gilt buckles. The interior is lined with velvet and satin.

The sculptor Sir Joseph Wilton produced the elaborate carvings on the coach. The roof supports three cherubs representing the union of England, Scotland and Ireland. They carry the Imperial Crown and hold the sword, sceptre and the badge representing Knighthood. The branches of eight gilded palm trees frame the roof. Four corner trees rise from a lion's head and are decorated with symbols of Britain's victory in the Seven Years' War with France. The war was drawing to a close when the coach was built in 1762.

Morocco leather straps support the body of the coach and are held by four tritons, mythical sea-gods with a man's head and a dolphin's tail. At the front wheels, the tritons seem to be using the straps to pull the coach. They are blowing conchs, trumpet-like shells to herald the arrival of the Monarch of the Ocean. Gilded dolphins hold in place the bar by which the coach is drawn, and the driver's foot board (no longer used) is in the shape of a scallop shell. The two tritons at the back carry imperial symbols, representing Britain's maritime traditions and status as a dominant sea power. The carvings give the Gold Coach the air of a triumphant chariot, reflecting Britain's powerful position in the world at the time.

As the coach is suspended from long leather thoroughbraces, it sways back and forth, and from side to side. The coach also lacks the more modern comforts of other royal coaches which have electric windows, heating, and hydraulic stabilizers.

Gold State Coach details

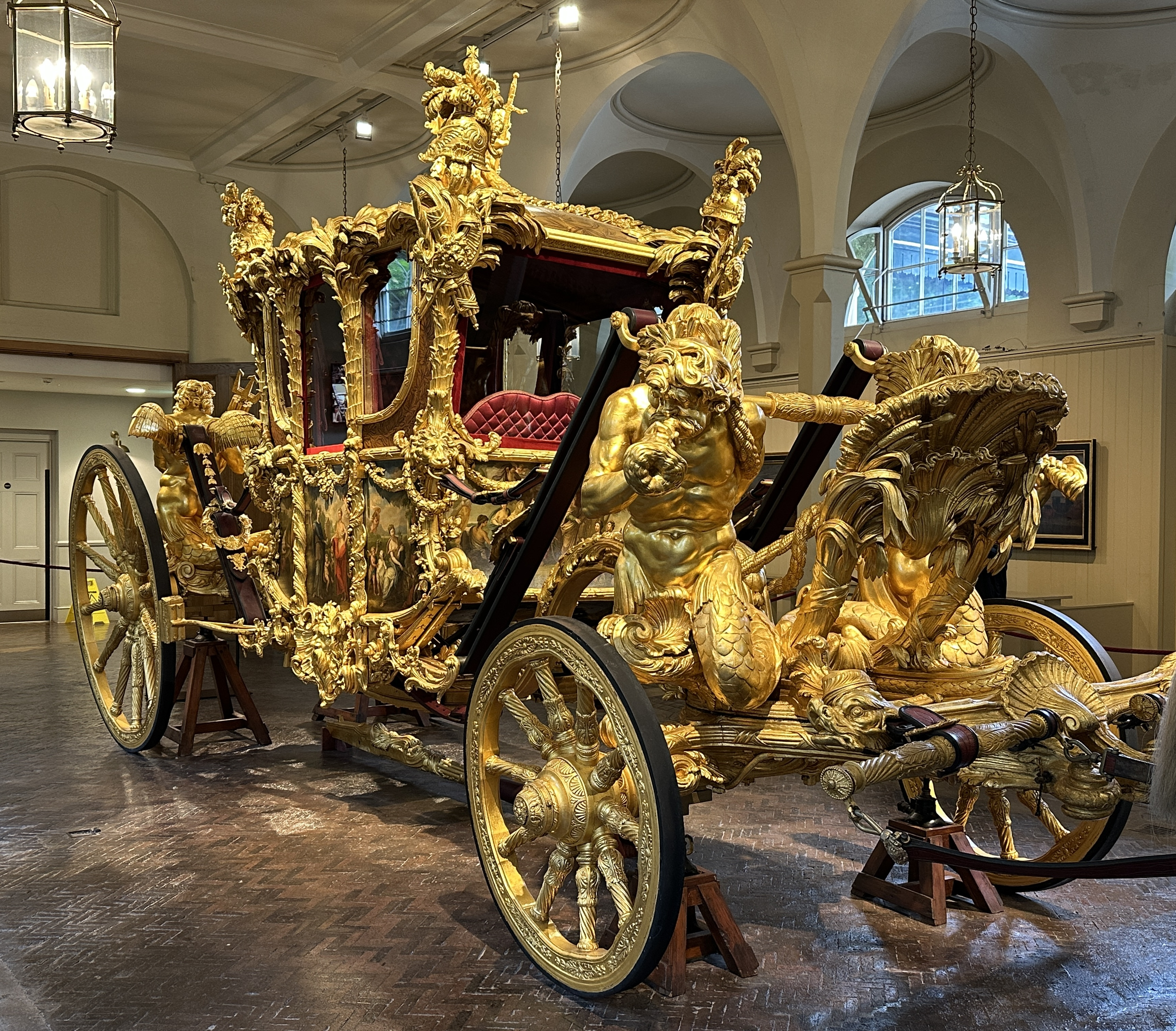
Exhibited in the Royal Mews at Buckingham Palace in 2026

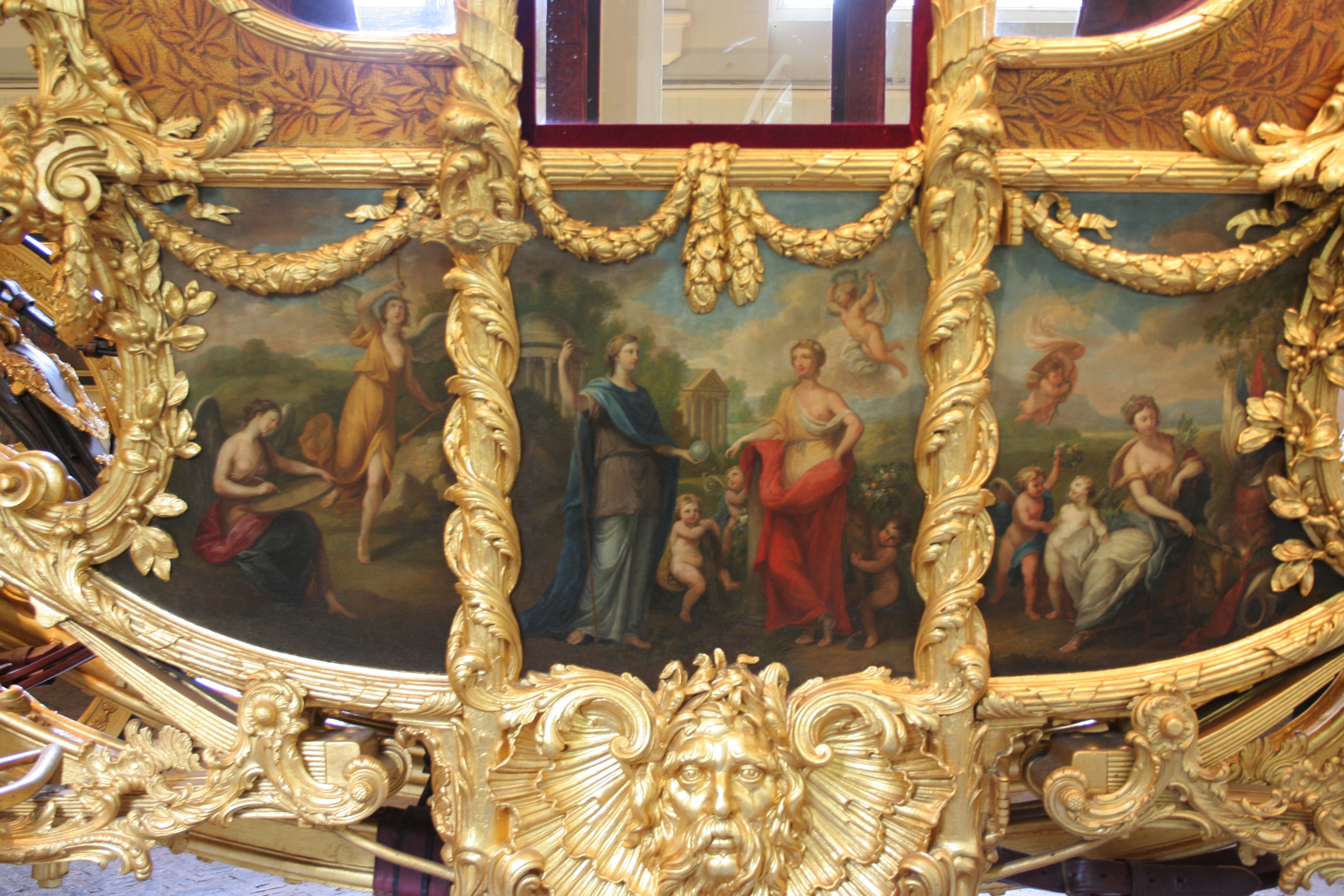
Close up of artwork by Giovanni Cipriani

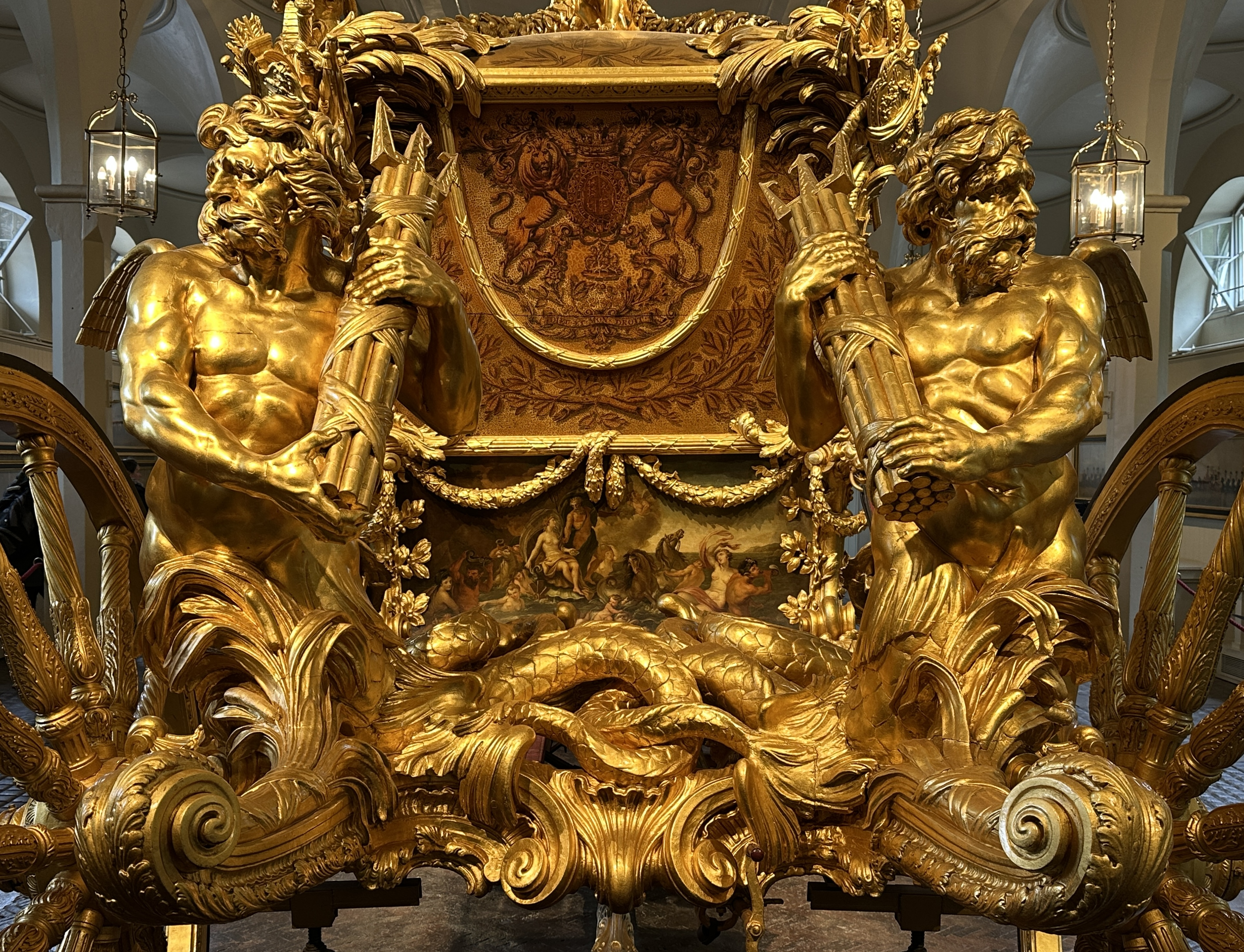
Gilded Triton figures (rear)

== Horses and attendants ==
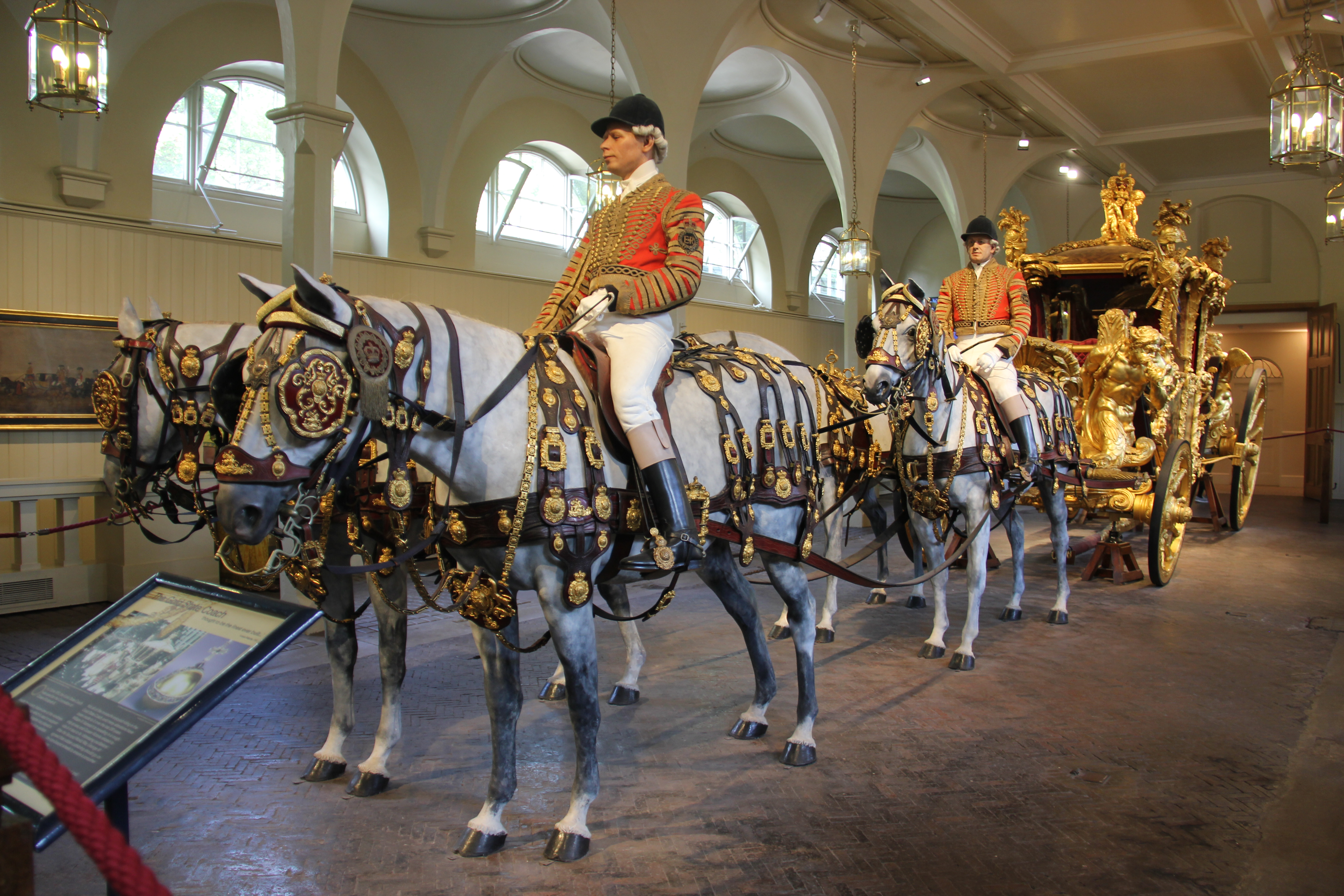
The coach's display with mannequins shows the elaborate harness and livery costumes

The Gold State Coach is so heavy it is only pulled at a walk, by a team of eight Windsor Grey horses wearing the Red Morocco harness. The coach was originally driven by a coachman, but is now guided by postilion (riders).

Dressed in royal livery, there are four postilions, nine walking grooms (one next to each horse, and one walking behind the coach), six footmen who walk beside the body of the coach, and four Yeoman of the Guard carrying their long partisans. The grooms may help handle the horses if the animals become unruly, and they carry crooked walking-sticks to hold up the traces that may become slack when the coach is taking a corner. The coach's brakes are operated by a groom on the ground behind the coach; it takes 27 metres (89 ft) to stop the heavy coach.

== History ==
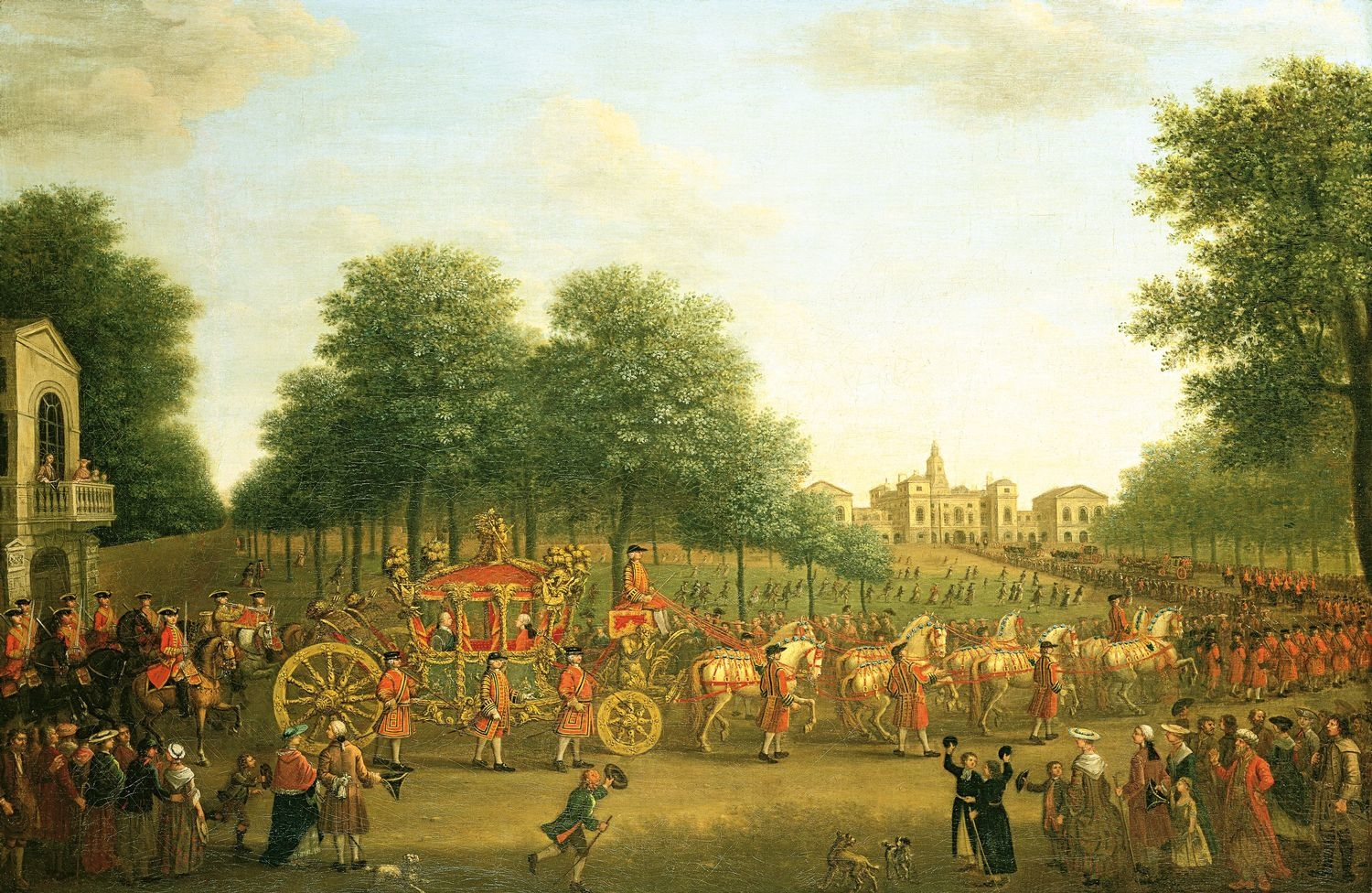
George III's procession to the Houses of Parliament c. 1762–64; attributed to John Wootton

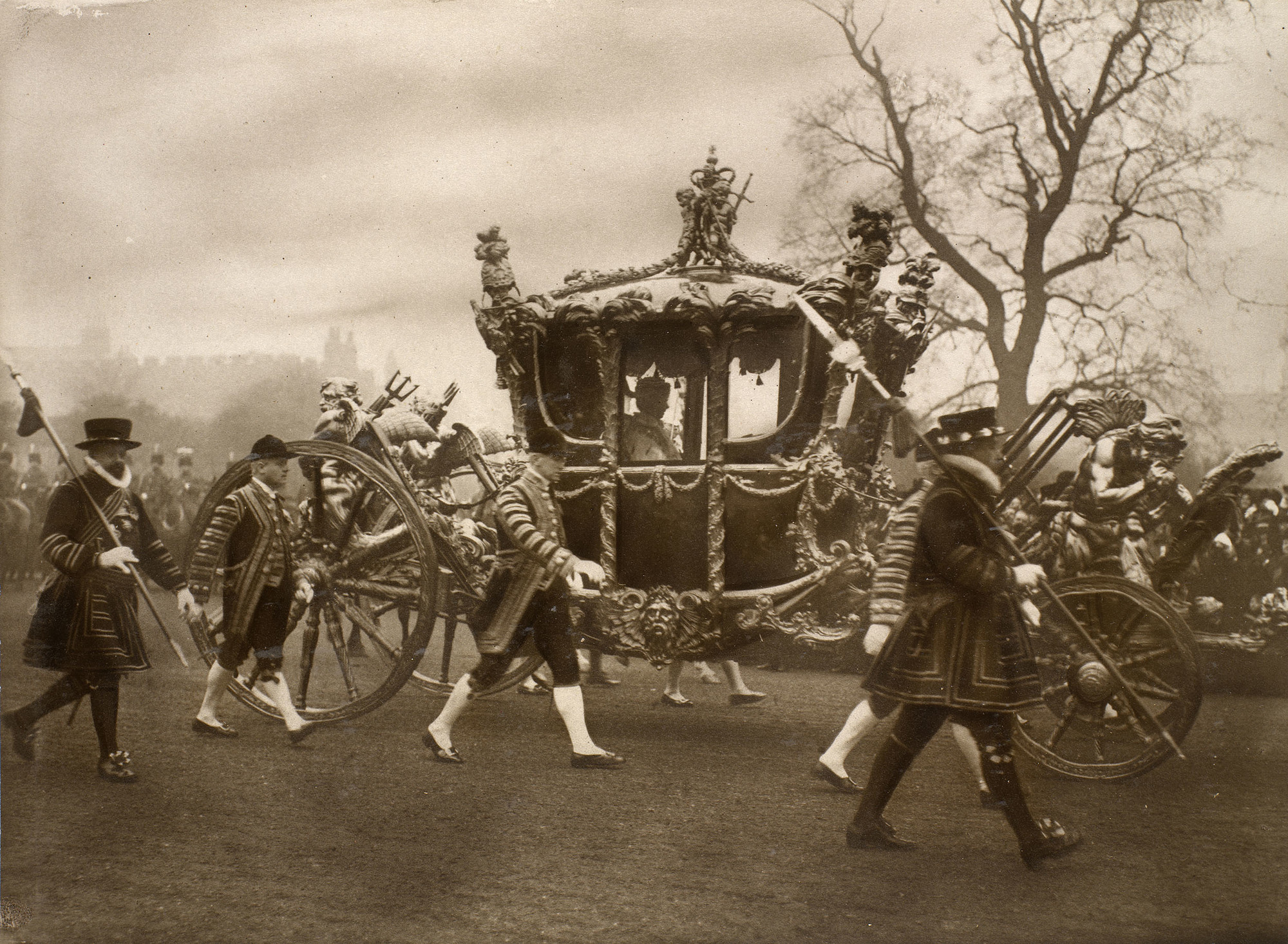
King George V and Queen Mary, 6 February 1911

The Gold State Coach was first used by George III at the State Opening of Parliament in 1762. In this painting, it emerges from St James's Palace and turns into the Mall. The King sits facing forward, while the coachman controls four pairs of horses from a box seat (which was later removed in favor of using postilion riders, à la Daumont). Because the coach is extremely heavy, eight horses are required to pull it at a walking pace.

Most monarchs have expressed displeasure in riding the Gold State Coach. In the words of King William IV, a former naval officer, being driven in the Gold State Coach was like being on board a ship "tossing in a rough sea". Queen Victoria complained of the "distressing oscillation" of the cabin. She would often refuse to ride in the Gold State Coach. The original box seat was removed before Edward VII's Coronation in 1902 to give the public a clearer view of the monarch. The Coach remained in regular use throughout the eighteenth and nineteenth centuries. King George VI said that his journey from the palace to Westminster Abbey for his coronation was "one of the most uncomfortable rides I have ever had in my life". He had the coach overhauled after the Second World War. In 1953 the wheels' iron rims were replaced with rubber tyres. Up to 2011 the leather suspension straps were of unequal length which caused an unequal swing in a figure of eight. These changes improved the ride for passengers.

== Modern use ==
Queen Elizabeth II referred to her coronation journey in the coach as "horrible" and "not very comfortable", which is possibly why it was not used for her Diamond Jubilee when she was aged 86, having previously been used for her Silver and Golden Jubilee celebrations. It was brought back as part of a pageant for her Platinum Jubilee celebrations with a Pepper's ghost effect being used to show archive film footage of the young Queen waving to crowds from the coach.

King Charles III rode in the Diamond Jubilee State Coach to his coronation, opting to only use the Gold State Coach on the return to Buckingham Palace due to the poor ride quality.

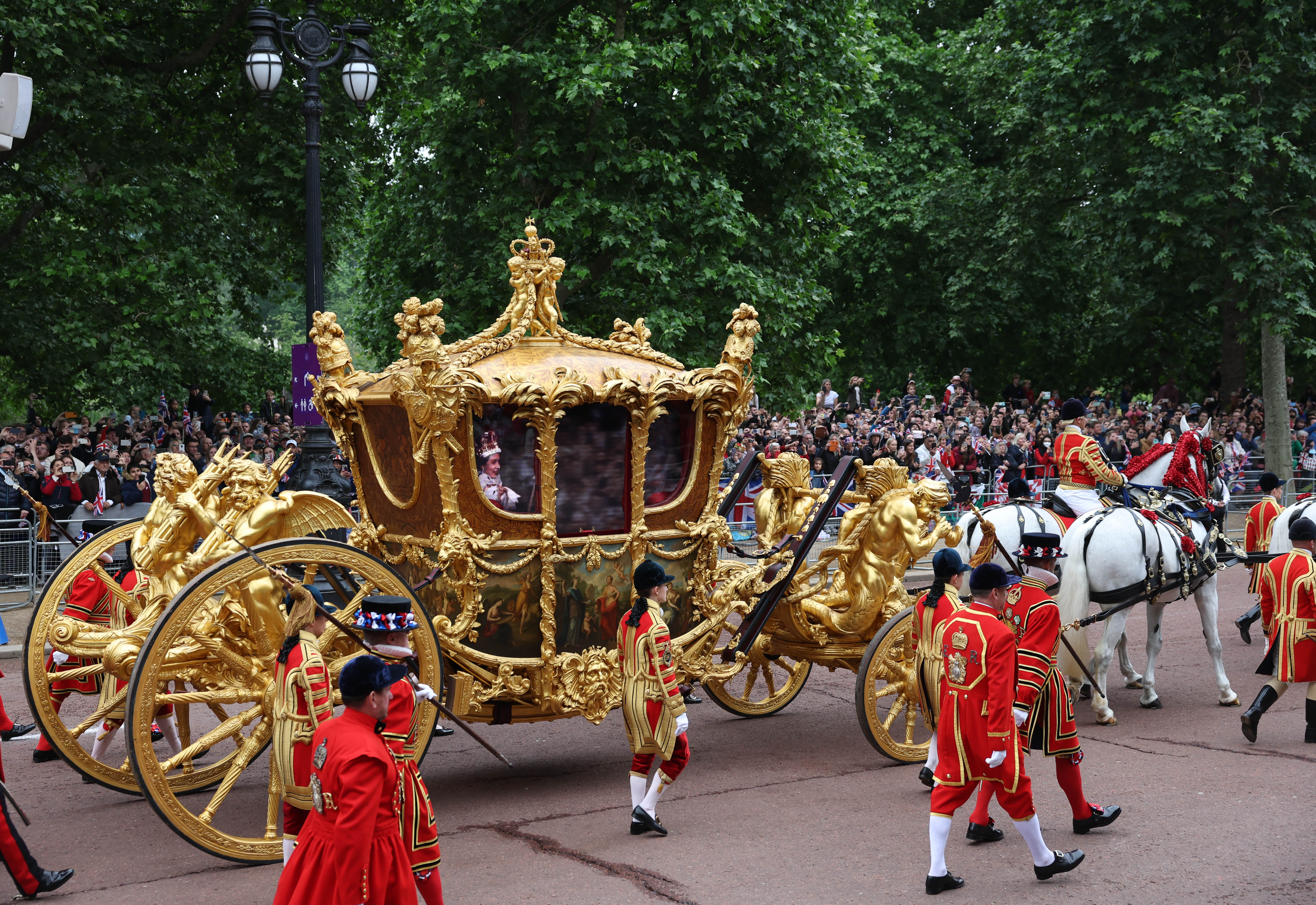
Illusion of a younger Queen Elizabeth sitting in the coach, 2022

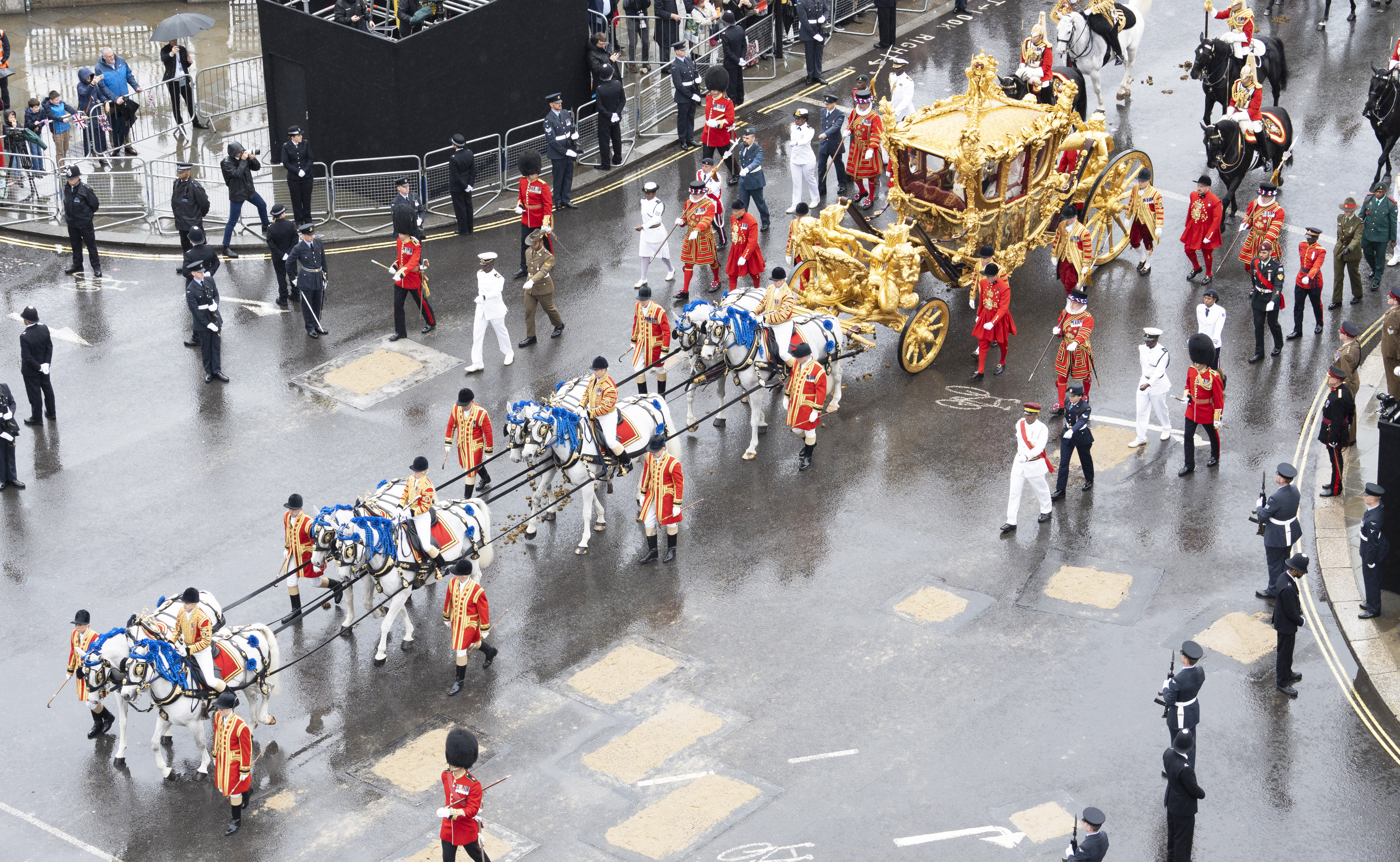
The Coronation procession, 2023

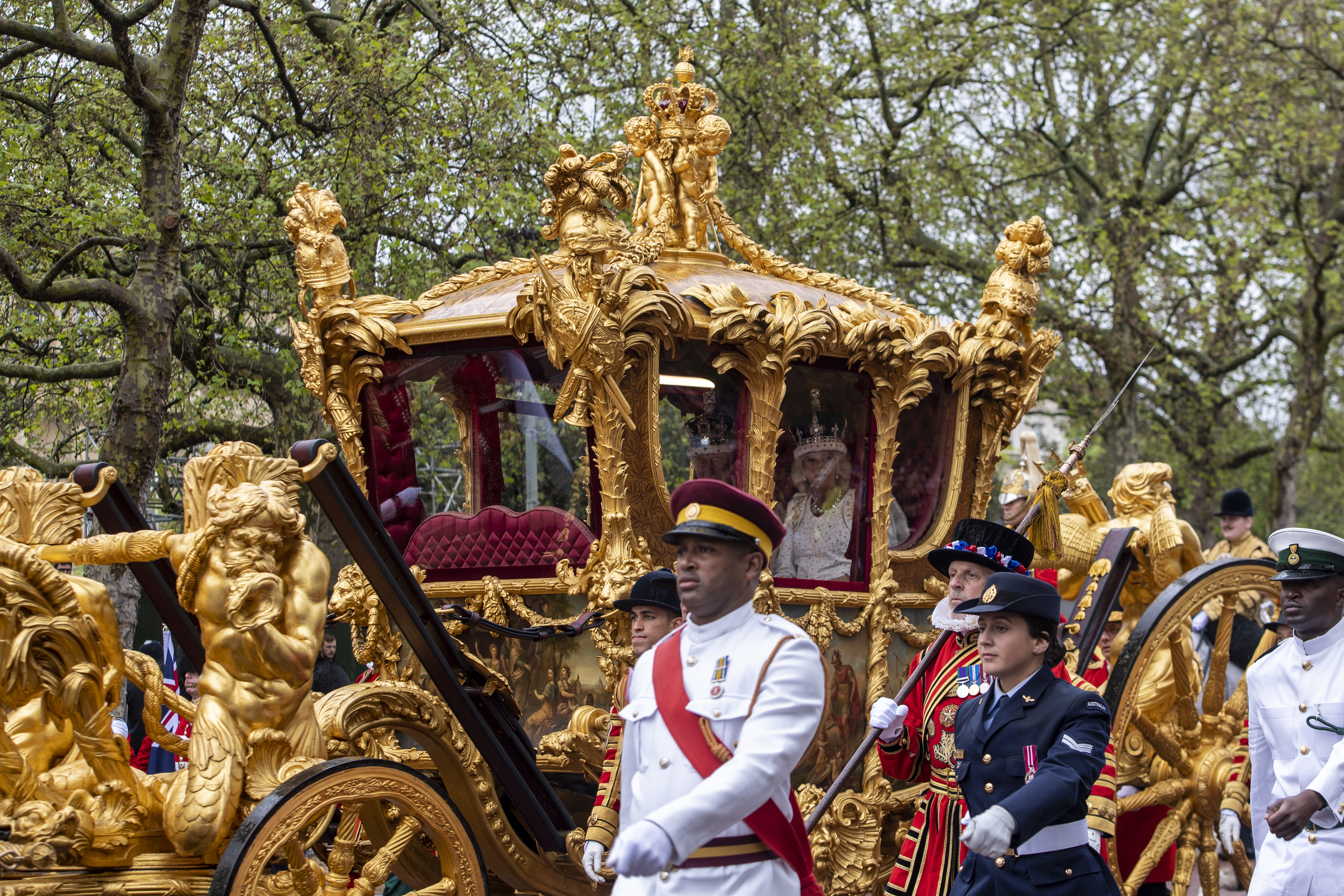
King Charles III and Queen Camilla, 2023

== See also ==
- List of state coaches
