= Diamond Jubilee State Coach =

British royal carriage

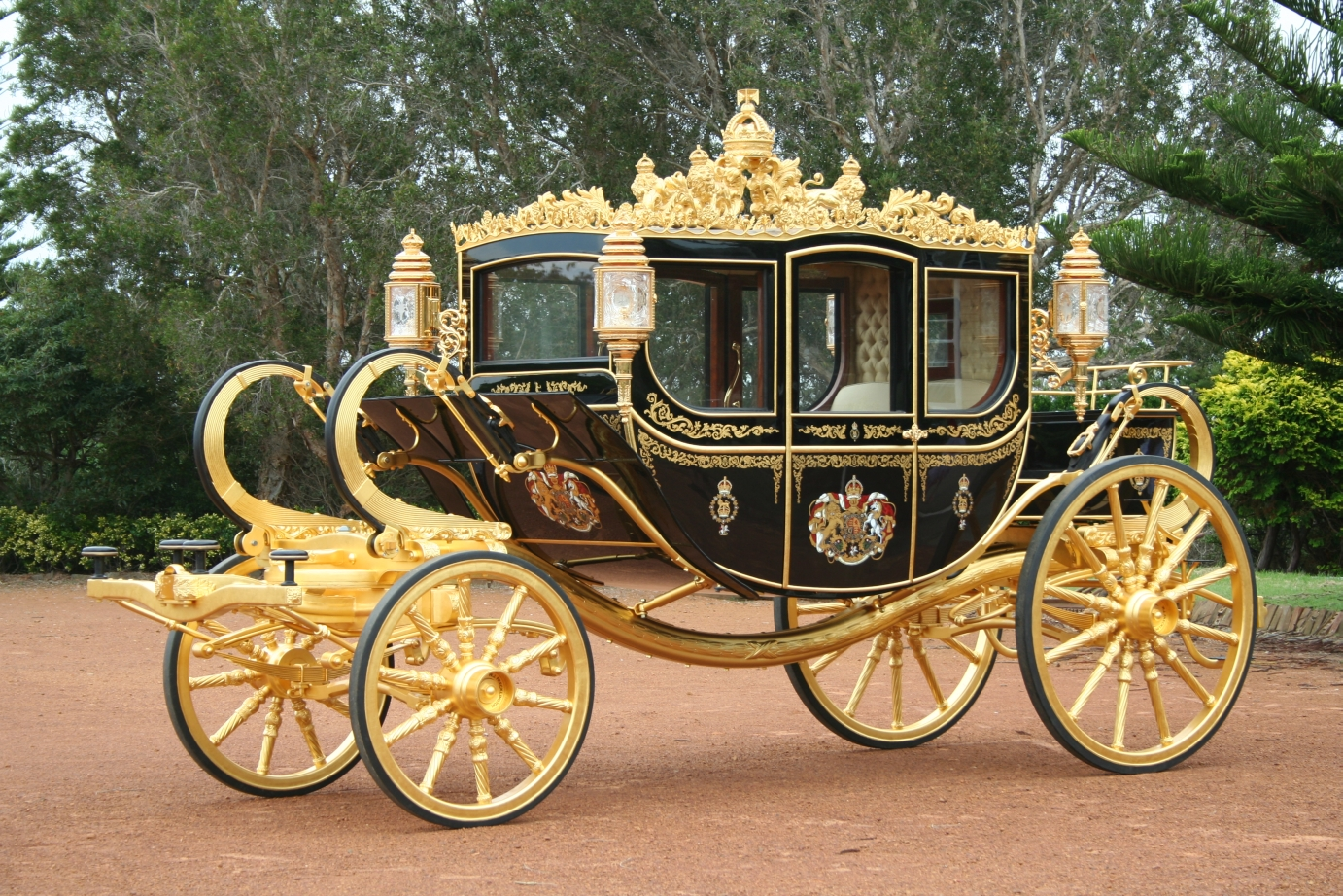
Diamond Jubilee State Coach

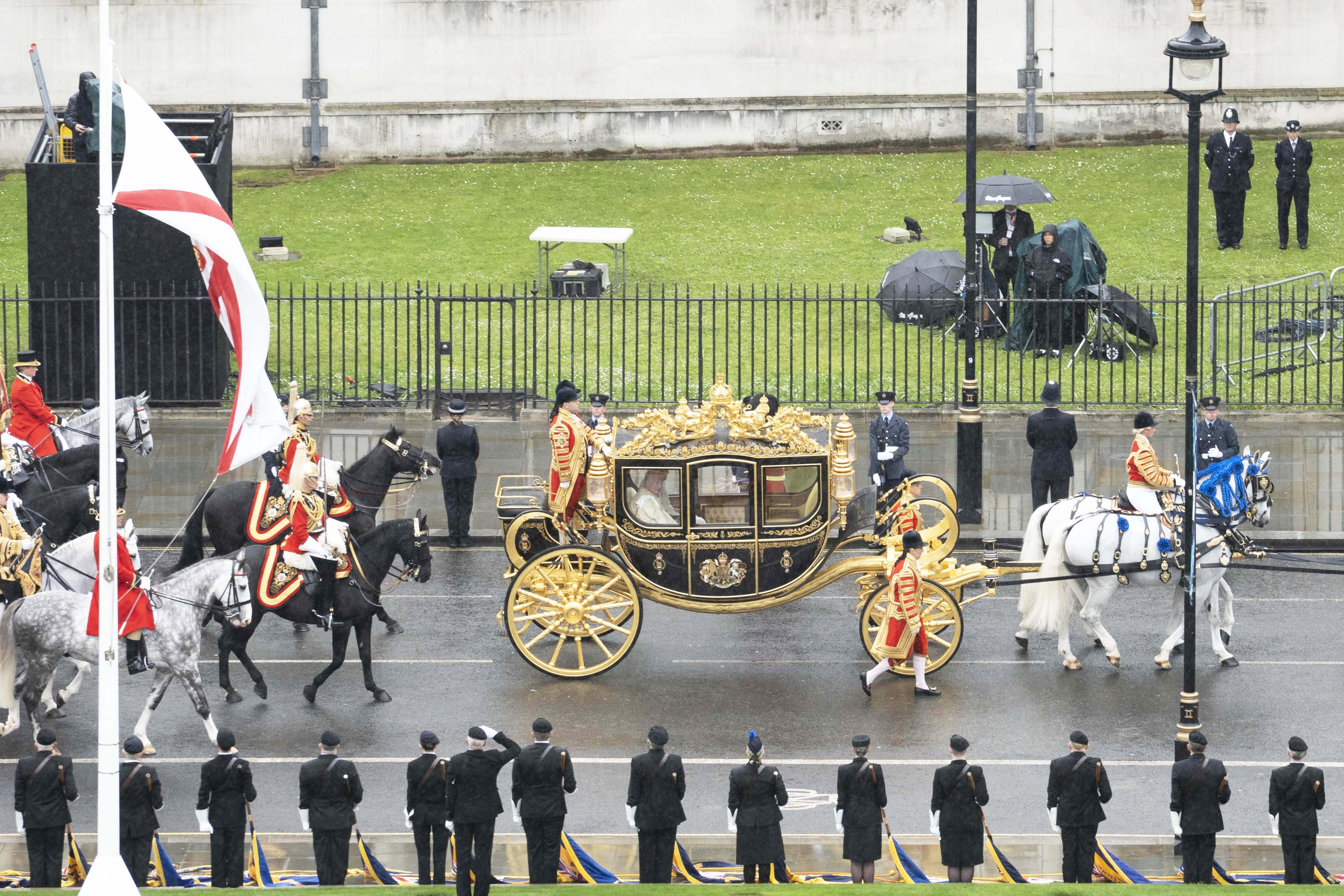
The Diamond Jubilee State Coach conveyed King Charles III and Queen Camilla to their coronation on 6 May 2023.

The Diamond Jubilee State Coach (initially known as the State Coach Britannia) is an enclosed, six-horse-drawn carriage that was made to commemorate Queen Elizabeth II's 80th birthday, but completion was delayed for nearly eight years. Eventually, it became a commemoration for the Queen's Diamond Jubilee.

The coach was used for the first time at the State Opening of Parliament on 4 June 2014. It has been in regular service since, and is housed in the Royal Mews along with the other state coaches. The coach was used to carry King Charles III and Queen Camilla from Buckingham Palace to their coronation at Westminster Abbey.

== Background ==
The carriage was built in Australia by coachbuilder W. J. Frecklington, who previously built the Australian State Coach, in 1988. Although completed in 2010, the coach did not arrive in London until March 2014 due to issues with funding. Buckingham Palace stated that Frecklington had completed the coach of his own initiative and that it was not an official state coach, although Frecklington stated that the coach was endorsed (but not commissioned) by Buckingham Palace. Frecklington funded the construction of the coach as a private initiative with some help from the Australian government in form of a $250,000 (£138,000) grant and a mortgage on his house to fund the $5M (£2.7m) project. The coach was subsequently purchased by the Royal Collection Trust for an undisclosed sum, becoming part of the Royal Collection.

Frecklington's intention was to create a coach that would encapsulate the history and heritage of the United Kingdom by incorporating material from Britain's historic buildings, ships and other artefacts. The Diamond Jubilee State Coach is therefore an especially wide-ranging representation of the great events, figures and objects of British history ever assembled, items directly related to more than 30 kings and queens of England, Scotland and Ireland, the most influential characters in British history, her greatest victories, her most treasured places, and her greatest contributions to the world.

== Description ==
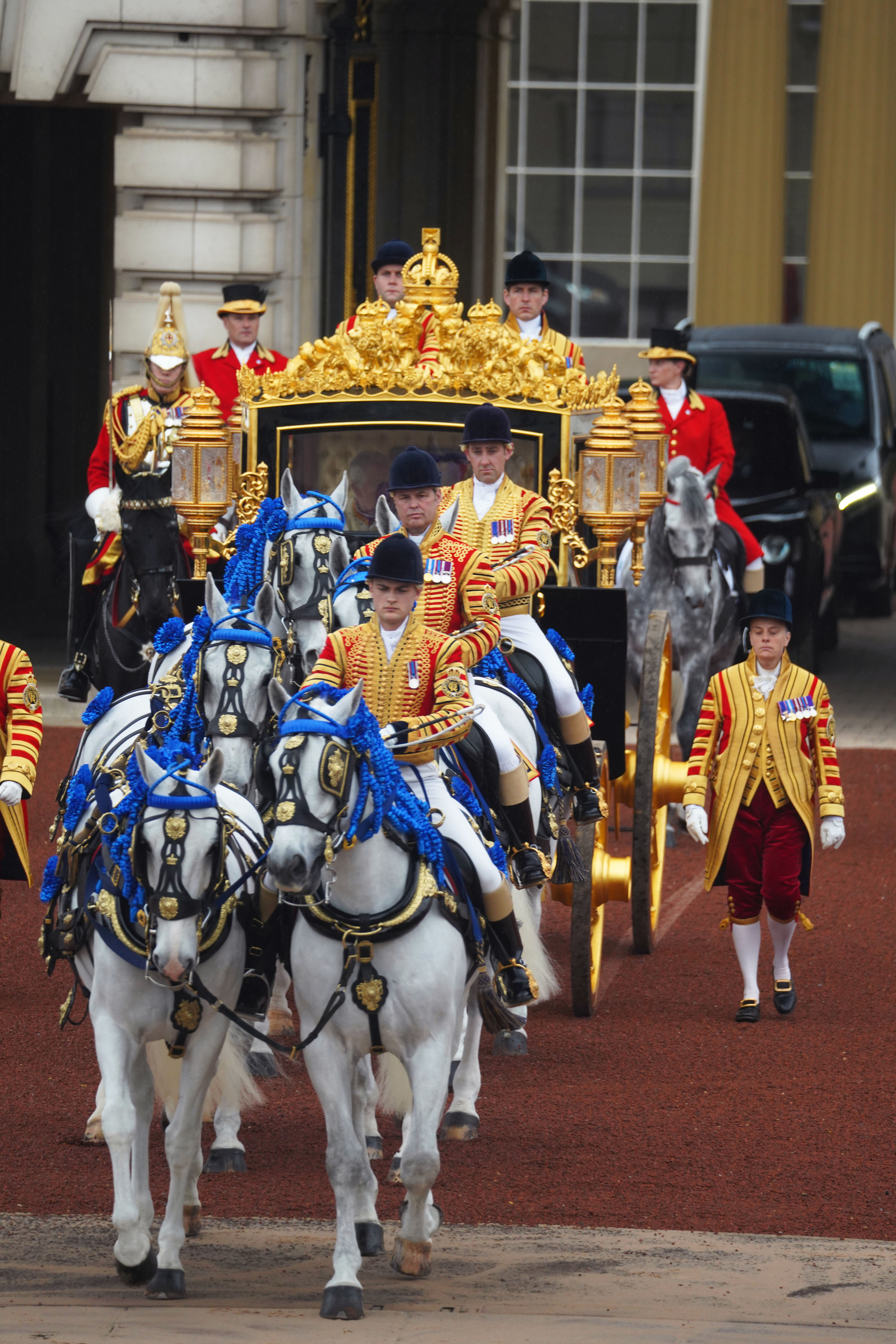
The coach is pulled by six Windsor Grey horses and guided by postilion riders dressed in state livery.

- The coach weighs 2.75 tons and is 18 ft long (5.5 m) and 11 ft high (3.4 m).
- The coach has electric windows, heating, air conditioning, and 6 hydraulic stabilisers. The body is essentially made of aluminium.
- The crown atop the roof is carved from timber from Lord Nelson's flagship, HMS Victory.
- Timber segments from The Tower of London, Westminster Abbey, St Paul's Cathedral, Edinburgh Castle, Henry VIII's flagship Mary Rose, Mayflower, Balmoral Castle, Blenheim Palace, Caernarfon Castle, Canterbury Cathedral, Carlisle Cathedral, Chichester Cathedral, Durham Cathedral, Ely Cathedral, Hampton Court Palace, Holyrood Palace, Kensington Palace, Lincoln Cathedral, Liverpool Anglican Cathedral, Osborne House, Salisbury Cathedral, St George's Chapel, Stirling Castle, The Palace of Westminster, the Royal Pavilion, the White House at Kew, Wells Cathedral, Westminster Cathedral, Winchester Cathedral, Windsor Castle, York Minster and others are inlaid into the interior lining of the coach.
- Also included is material donated by the Scottish Government from the Stone of Scone, wood from the Ferriby Boats (~1800BC), a segment of material donated by the Canadian Government from the Franklin expedition 1845 and others from the former Royal Yacht HMY Britannia, HMS Endeavour, The Battle of Hastings, RMS Queen Mary, RMS Olympic, SS Great Britain, RSS Discovery, an original counterweight from Big Ben, a Battle of Britain Spitfire and Hawker Hurricane, a Dambusters Lancaster, and part of a musketball from the Battle of Waterloo.
- Segments related to Shakespeare, Sir Isaac Newton, Charles Darwin, Edward Jenner, John Harrison, Joseph Banks, Florence Nightingale and other famous figures are also included as well as digital copies of Magna Carta and Domesday Book.
- The two door handles, made by a New Zealand jeweller, are each decorated with 24 diamonds and 130 sapphires.
- The lamps were handmade by Edinburgh Crystal.

Jean-Louis Libourel, a French historian and expert on horse-drawn vehicles, wrote how the Diamond Jubilee State Coach is a copy of the Australian State Coach, which is itself a copy of the Irish State Coach. Libourel called the Diamond Jubilee a "clumsy pastiche" of extraordinary expenditure without any novel artistry. He criticized the lack of lightness and elegance, the heavy undercarriage accentuated by over-gilding, the modern conveniences, and the corporate-style interior devoid of royal splendor.

== See also ==
- List of state coaches
- State Opening of Parliament
- Royal Mews
