= Barouche =

4-wheeled horse-drawn carriage

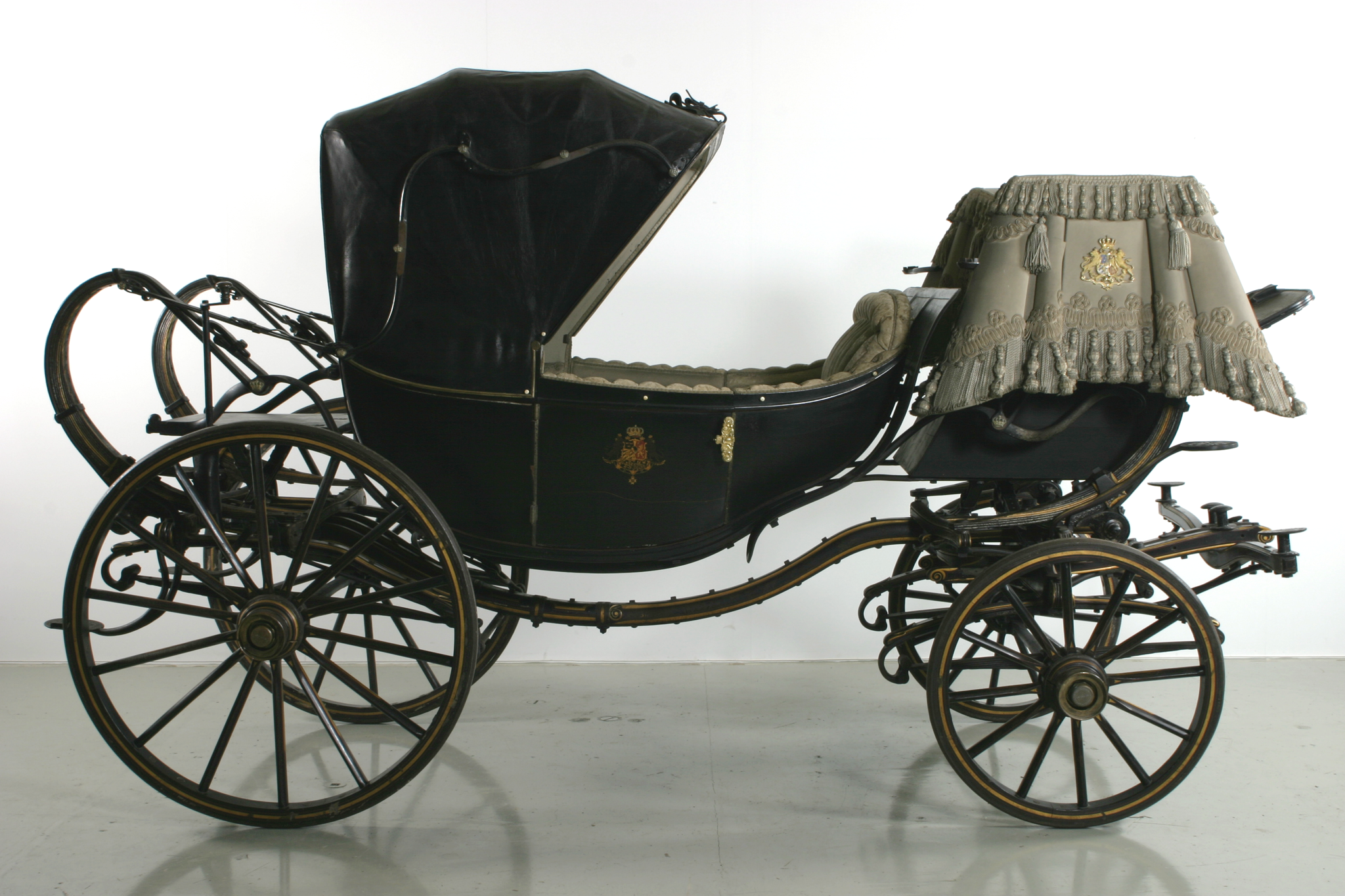
A barouche in the Royal Armory in Sweden

A barouche or calèche is a large four-wheeled carriage designed for display and summer leisure driving. Drawn by a pair or team of horses, it has a canoe-shaped body with a folding leather hood over the rear seat. It seats four passengers face-to-face, and the vehicle is driven from a high coachman's seat or by a postilion. Popular for town driving throughout the 19th century, the barouche was regarded as a luxurious and fashionable carriage type. Although no longer used in everyday transport, barouches are still used in ceremonial processions by several European royal households, and many historical examples can be seen in carriage museums.

== Design ==
A barouche is an open carriage with four wheels. It is a summer vehicle with a canoe-shaped body and a folding leather hood over the rear seat. It seats four passengers face-to-face, with the front seat being a smaller fold-down seat. There is often a flap to cover the knees of the rear passengers or the interior from rain. It is driven by a pair or team of horses, either from a high box seat or by postilion. The suspension is leather braces and cee-springs. Elliptical springs were used with some newer models.

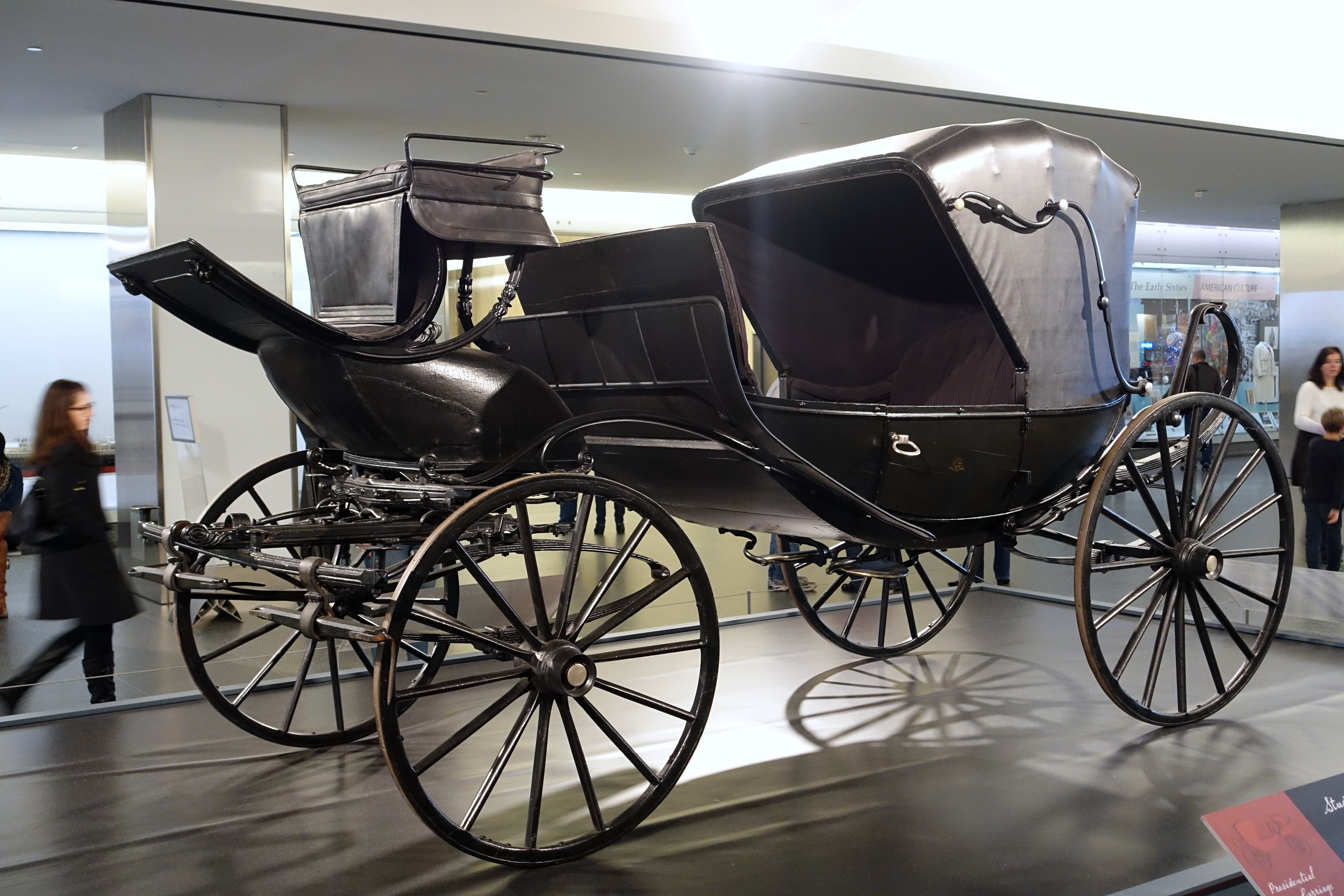
Abraham Lincoln's barouche

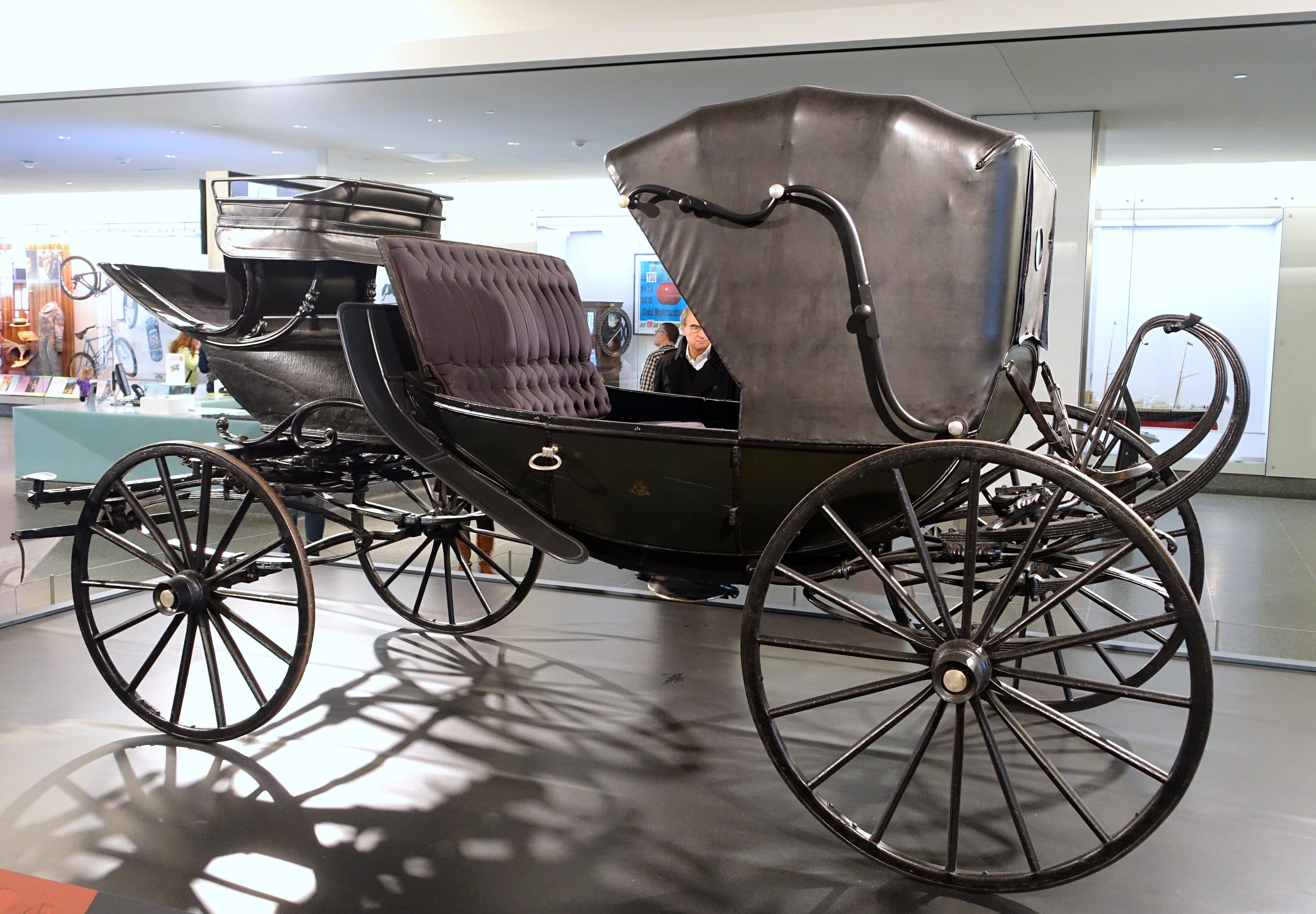
Shows the forward seat and lack of underperch in this barouche

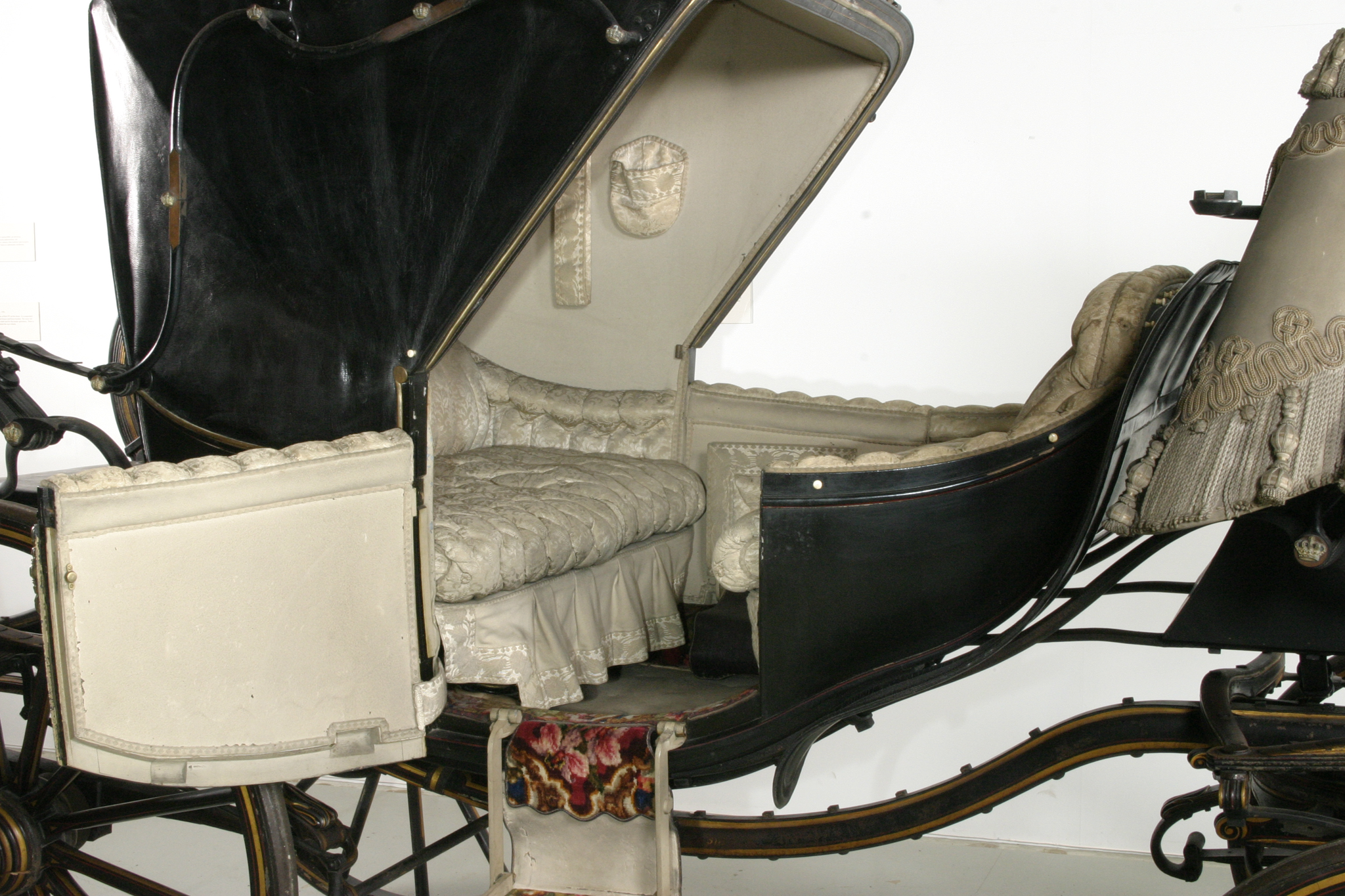
Shows luxuriously decorated interior

=== Name variations ===
When the vehicle was first introduced to England from Germany in around 1760, it was called a German wagon. It later acquired the name barouche as an anglicisation of the German word barutsche.

The words calash, calèche (French), and barutsche (German) are usually considered near-equivalents of barouche. The brett and the britzka are also closely related carriages. Many of these terms were used synonymously, though usage varied by region and period. In some cases, calash and calèche were applied to entirely different vehicle types.

In the American West, the term buckboard-barouche was sometimes used for a large buckboard employed as a stagecoach before the introduction of the Concord coach. Despite the name, it was not structurally related to the barouche carriage.

=== Design variations ===
The extension top barouche has a double-hood or two half-hoods, protecting all occupants. It is also called a barouche-sociable.

The barouche landau has a higher than average box seat, a rumble seat for two grooms, and was driven by four horses. It was popular with amateur drivers.

The barouchet is a barouche shortened by removing the front quarter panel. Also called a demi-barouche or a coupelet. Drawn by a single horse and sometimes built without a coachman's seat.

== Historical context ==
The barouche was used in the 19th century for display and summer leisure driving. It was designed to give a powerful impression of luxury and elegance. The barouche became fashionable in Britain and continental Europe in the early 19th century and remained popular for town driving until the rise of lighter, more practical vehicles later in the century.

== Modern usage ==
Although no longer used in everyday transport, barouches are still used in ceremonial processions by several European royal households, and many historical examples can be seen in carriage museums.

The Crème Calèche is a richly decorated barouche of the Royal House of the Netherlands, drawn by six horses and guided by postilions. The carriage was used for the 1948 inauguration of Queen Juliana, at the opening of the 1994 FEI World Equestrian Games in The Hague, and has been used for state visits.

Barouches in contemporary use

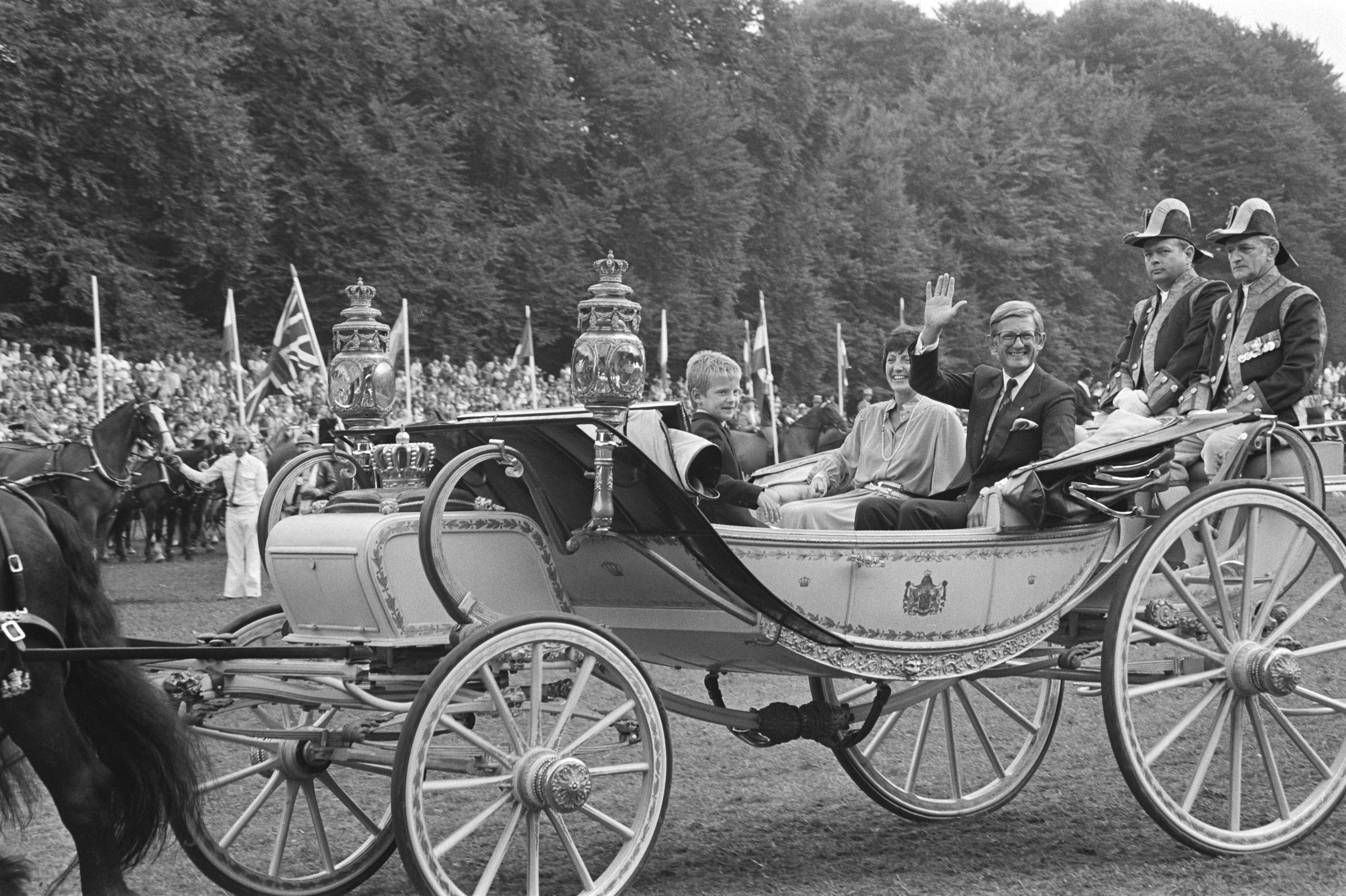
Netherlands' Crème Calèche in 1982

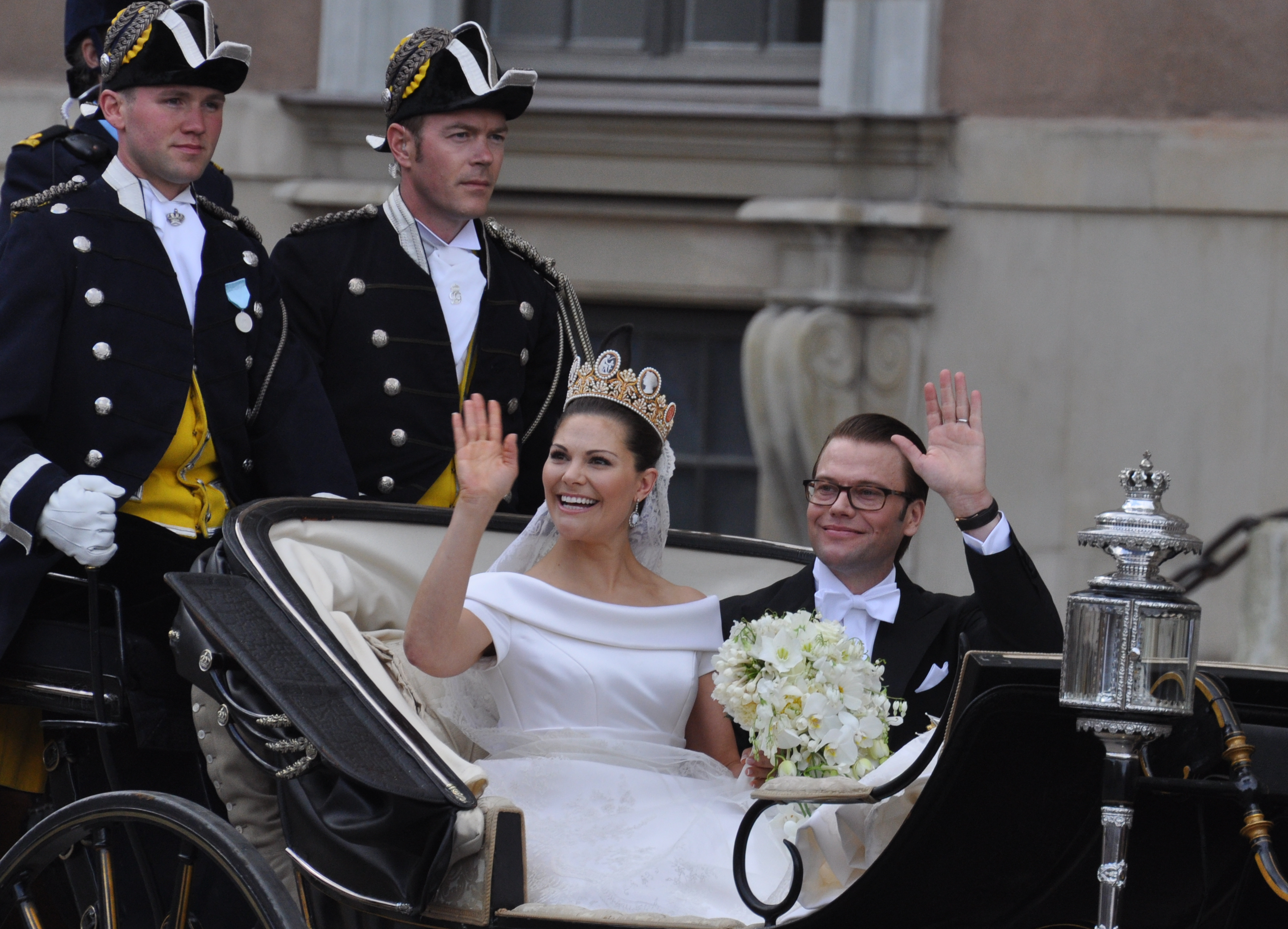
Sweden's Gala Barouche No. 3 in 2010

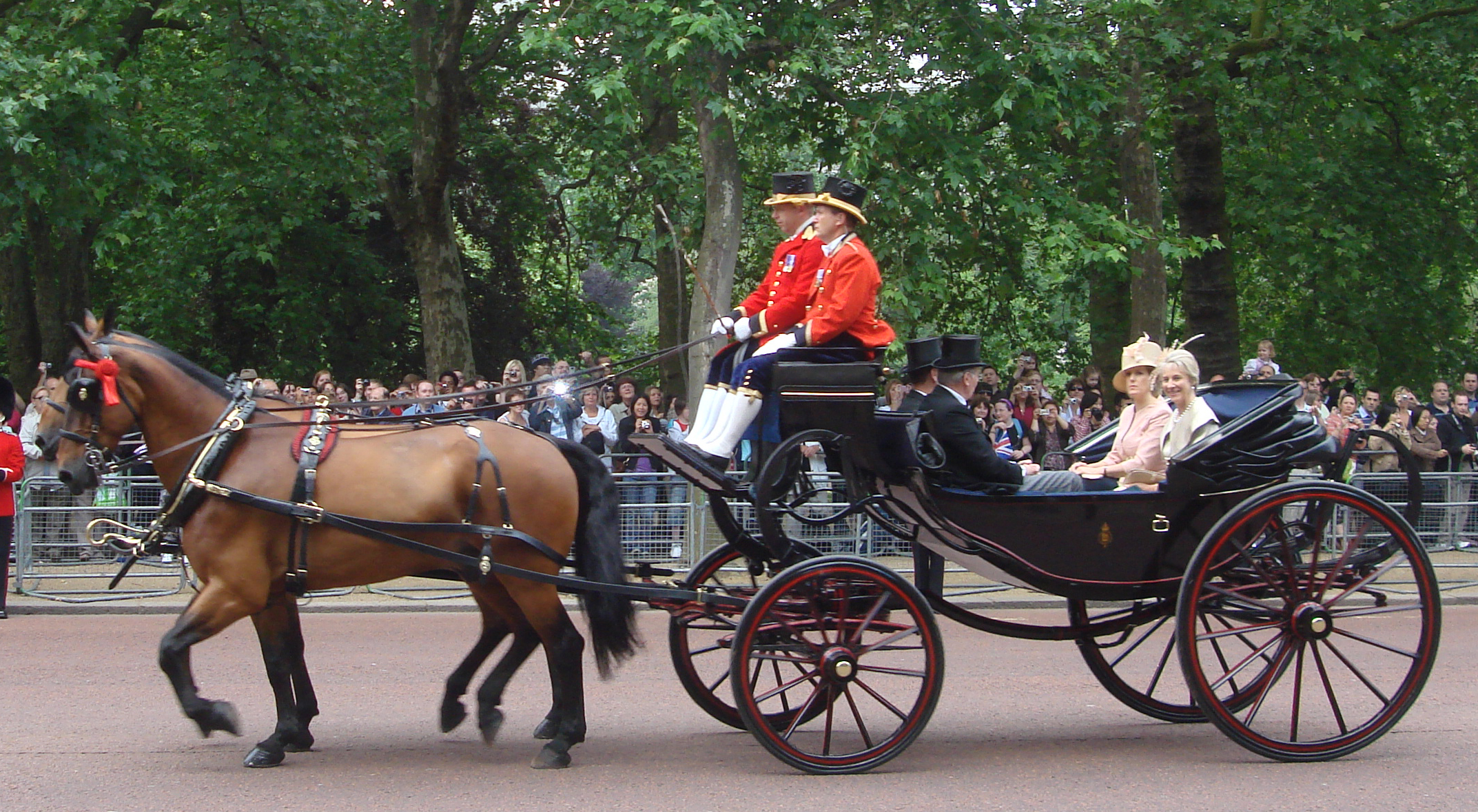
England's Royal barouche in 2009

== In literature ==
Barouches appear frequently in 19th-century literature. Jane Austen mentions a barouche-landau in Emma (1816), describing it as combining features of a barouche and a landau. Several of her characters, including Lady Dalrymple, Mr. and Mrs. Palmer, and Henry Crawford, are depicted owning or riding in barouches, and Austen herself rode in one in 1813.

The vehicle also appears in other works of the period, including Little Women by Louisa May Alcott and Nikolai Gogol's Dead Souls, in which the protagonist Chichikov travels in a barouche.
