= La plume de ma tante (phrase) =

Unusual phrase used to teach French

La plume de ma tante ("the quill of my aunt") is a phrase attributed to elementary French language instruction (possibly as early as the 19th century) and used as an example of grammatically correct phrases with limited practical application that are sometimes taught in introductory foreign language texts. As Life magazine said in 1958, "As every student knows, the most idiotically useless phrase in a beginner's French textbook is la plume de ma tante (the quill of my aunt)." The phrase is also used to refer to something deemed completely irrelevant. The term lent its name to the musical play La Plume de Ma Tante, which won a Tony Award in 1959.

The phrase is also used in teaching and remembering the sounds of the French vowel a; La plume de ma tante contains three instances of a that use two different pronunciations. Other limited-use phrases used as pronunciation guides include: Le petit bébé est un peu malade ("the little baby is slightly ill"), which contains six variants of e, and Un bon vin blanc ("a good white wine"), which contains four nasal vowels.

The phrase's French converse is "my tailor is rich", the first in the original English guide from French publisher Assimil. The similar, more recent phrase "Where is Brian? Brian is in the kitchen" was popularised by comedian Gad Elmaleh.

== In other media ==
In the 1973 horror film The Exorcist, Catholic priest Damien Karras interviews Regan MacNeil, a girl believed to suffer from demonic possession. While Karras probes to determine whether the possession is a hoax, the demon Pazuzu—who has possessed Regan—speaks in Latin and French, languages presumably unknown to Regan. When Karras demands "quod nomen mihi est?" ("what is my name?" in Latin), the demon exclaims "la plume de ma tante!", using the phrase as a non sequitur to mock and evade Karras' line of questioning.

The phrase can also be used to denote something that is not as useful or valuable as it once was, or not used for its original purpose. As the demon and Karras were both speaking Latin before, the demon could also be using it to mock the power of the Church.

In the 2019 series Good Omens, angel Aziraphale states that he has "learned French the hard way" by taking night classes, despite the fact that angels are able to speak every language in the world. He asks demon Crowley "où est la plume de la jardinière de ma tante?", to which Crowley replies "you don't have an aunt, she doesn't have a gardener, he doesn't have a pen." Aziraphale responds "but you understood me," to which Crowley answers "only because for 250 years you've been wittering on about the plume of your imaginary tante".

Singer and comedian Anna Russell wrote and performed a song called "Je n'ai pas la plume de ma tante" ("I don't have my aunt's quill"), as a parody of French art song.

Australian funk band Vaudeville Smash wrote a song "La Plume De Ma Tante" which features a protagonist attempting to seduce a woman only to have her reply: "La plume de ma tante".

In Carry On Don't Lose Your Head Kenneth Williams' character, Citizen Camembert, disguises himself as an alter ego called the Comte de la Plume de ma Tante.

== See also ==
- My postillion has been struck by lightning
