= My postillion has been struck by lightning =

Unusual sentence found in phrase books

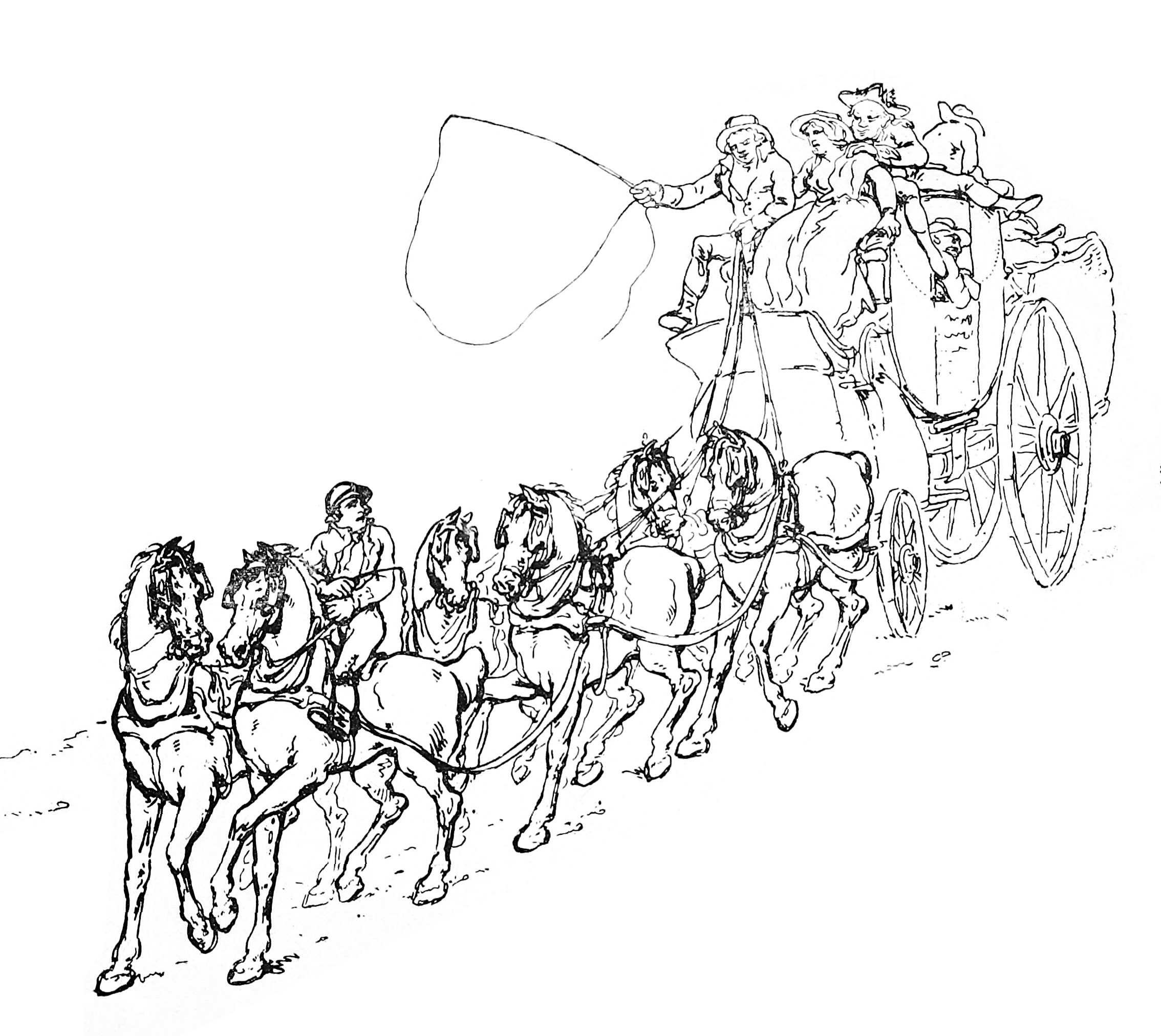
This English etching from 1793 shows a postillion mounted on the front left horse

"My postillion has been struck by lightning", "our postillion has been struck by lightning", and other variations on the same pattern, are often given as examples of the ridiculed phrases supposed to have been found in phrase books or language instruction in the nineteenth and early twentieth centuries. The word postillion, meaning a person who rides a harnessed horse that is pulling a horse-drawn vehicle rather than riding from behind, may occur in its alternative spelling postilion.

Although various forms of the sentence are widely cited, the exact wording and the context in which it is said to have originally been used vary. For example, a teaching manual attributes it to a Portuguese–English phrasebook (possibly alluding to English as She Is Spoke):

The phrase-book for Portuguese learners of English which included the often-quoted and bizarre sentence "Pardon me, but your postillion has been struck by lightning" demonstrates a total lack of sense of context: who can have said this, to whom and in what circumstances?

The linguistics textbook Applied Linguistics by Guy Cook, meanwhile, mentions the apocryphal phrase during a description of foreign language teaching in "the schoolrooms of Europe at the close of the nineteenth century":

Sentences—especially constructed to contain only the grammar and vocabulary which had already been covered—were laboriously translated, in writing, into and out of the student's first language. Such sentences, often bizarrely remote from any conceivable use, have been the occasion for jokes ever since. We have probably all heard references to the apocryphal "My postilion has been struck by lightning" and the infamous plume de ma tante.

== Origin ==
During the nineteenth century, publishers began producing multilingual phrase-books for businessmen and wealthy travellers. An early example is Georg Wolfrum's Handbuch für Jünglinge (1825), which gives English, German, French and Italian versions of "Are the postilions insolent?" The same question is found in Baedeker's Conversationsbuch für Reisende.

John Murray's Handbook of Travel-Talk (1847) includes a section entitled "Accidents on a Journey". It gives English, French, German and Italian translation suggestions for a variety of mishaps which might befall a traveller, such as one's postillion becoming injured, or finding oneself in stormy weather:

Oh, dear! The postilion has been thrown (off) down.
Is he hurt? Run for assistance to the next cottage.
Ask for a surgeon.
I am afraid he has broken his leg — his arm.
He has been bruised on his head.
He must be carried home gently.
It rains in torrents.
It lightens—it thunders.

A theatre review in the September 14, 1889, issue of the London illustrated weekly The Graphic includes a phrase very similar to the one under discussion, attributing it to Murray's travel guide:

The proprietor of the Greenwich Theatre has hit on the notion of ornamenting his playbills with a picture of the house, on which every exit is marked in conspicuous fashion. Somebody has objected that in the face of fire or panic no one would be likely to consult this guide to the methods of escape. This reminds one of the criticism of a gentleman on Mr. Murray's "Travel Talk," when he found the exclamation, "Dear me, our postillion has been struck dead by lightning!" set forth for his convenience in four languages.

The August 30, 1916, issue of the British magazine Punch includes this item:

An officer serving in the Balkans writes to say that he has just come across a Hungarian-English phrase-book which starts with the useful phrase, "My postilion has been struck by lightning."

Another usage of the phrase occurs in a 1932 book entitled Little Missions, written by "Septimus Despencer":

It was my fortune once to be marooned for twenty-four hours in a siding of a railway station in what is now Jugoslavia but was then South Hungary. I wandered into the village, and in the village shop which sold everything I found a dozen of old second-hand books. One of them was a Magyar-English Manual of Conversation containing useful phrases such as every traveller needs to know. The first section was headed 'On the road', and the first sentence in it (which I instantly mastered) was: 'Dear me, our postilion has been struck by lightning.' This is the sort of thing that only happens in Hungary; and, when it happens, this is the sort of remark that only Hungarians make.

According to its introduction, the travels reported in the book occurred during "[t]he three years following the armistice of 1918": thus Despencer's discovery of the phrase would be dated during the period 1919–1921. In the April 2008 issue of the Quote ... Unquote newsletter, Nigel Rees speculates that the phrase "passed into general circulation" from Despencer's book.

== Notable sightings ==
In James Thurber's 1937 New Yorker article "There's No Place Like Home", a phrasebook from "the era of Imperial Russia" contains the "magnificent" line: "Oh, dear, our postillion has been struck by lightning!". Thurber speculates that such a "fantastic piece of disaster" must have been rare, "even in the days of the Czars". Thurber heard of the quote from "a writer in a London magazine".

Olivia Manning's 1951 novel School for Love has a scene in which the landlady, Miss Bohun, is teaching English to Mr. Liftshitz using a Russian grammar from which she dictates the sentence "Coachman, the postillion has been struck by lightning."

In James Michener's 1954 novel Sayonara, the heroine Hana-Ogi tries to learn a little English from a phrasebook to communicate with her American lover and based on its recommendation starts with this phrase, much to his bewilderment.

"The Postilion Has Been Struck By Lightning" is the title of a two-stanza poem by Patricia Beer, published in 1967. The poem was later selected for inclusion in The Oxford Book of Contemporary Verse. In it, the author laments the death in a thunderstorm of "the best postilion I ever had".

In 1977 actor Dirk Bogarde titled the first volume of his autobiography A Postillion Struck By Lightning. According to Bogarde, he heard of the sentence while on a childhood holiday in France. It came from an old French phrase-book belonging to the nanny of another family.

A jocular verse titled "Ballad of Domestic Calamity" attributed to M.H. Longson contains the phrase at the end of each stanza.

In a 1995 paper, linguist David Crystal defined "postilion sentences" as "sentences introduced in teaching [that] seem to have little or no chance of ever being used in real life". They are named after the phrase "The postilion has been struck by lightning", which Crystal describes as a famous example of such a sentence. He goes on to suggest that "an unexpectedly large number of sentences, used routinely with children with language impairment, are of this type", and gives as examples "That table's got four legs", and "Clap (your) hands!". He concludes that, "if teaching and therapeutic time is to be truly efficacious", postilion sentences should be avoided.

== See also ==
- "Dirty Hungarian Phrasebook", a sketch from the television series Monty Python's Flying Circus
- English As She Is Spoke, Portuguese-to-English phrasebook notorious for its overly literal translations
- La plume de ma tante (phrase), stock phrase associated with rudimentary French language education
- I Can Eat Glass, website focused on foreign language translations of the titular phrase
- Zuiikin' English, Japanese television show whose esoteric example phrases became the subject of internet memes
- dónde está la biblioteca, stock phrase associated with rudimentary Spanish language education

== Bibliography ==
- Crystal, David (1995). "Postilion Sentences" (PDF). Journal of Clinical Speech and Language Studies. 5 (5): 12–22. doi:10.3233/ACS-1995-5104. S2CID 246582121.
- Despencer, Septimus (1932). Little Missions. London: E. Arnold & Co. OCLC 3795596.
