= I Can Eat Glass =

Linguistic project

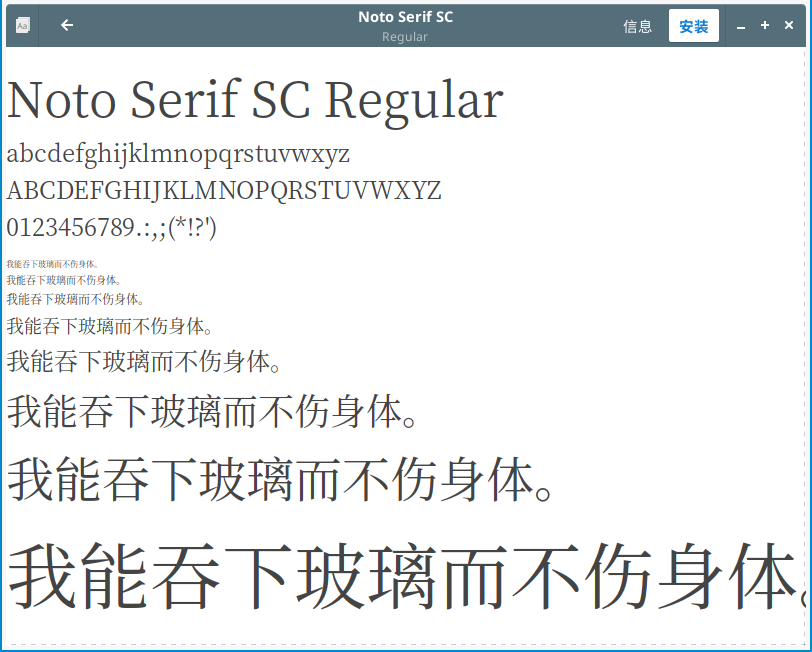
The Simplified Chinese translation of "I can eat glass, it does not hurt me" is used as sample text in GNOME Font Viewer.

I Can Eat Glass was a website created in the mid-1990s that collected more than 150 translations of the phrase "I can eat glass, it does not hurt me". Broken glass is sharp and can cause injury (for example flying glass), and consumption could cause dangerous internal bleeding. Ethan Mollick, then a student at Harvard, chose the unorthodox phrase because he believed visitors to foreign countries typically learn common phrases in the foreign language such as "where is the bathroom?" which instantly reveal they are tourists. "But, if one says 'I can eat glass, it doesn't hurt me,' you will be viewed as an insane native, and treated with dignity and respect", Mollick explained. He described The I Can Eat Glass Project as "a challenge to the human spirit" and compared it to the Apollo program and the Panama Canal.

The site contained a world map that revealed detailed translations in the local language of the area a user clicked. It was covered in the press in 1996. Mollick's original page disappeared in or about June 2004, but the phrase has continued as an absurdist example in linguistics. The project is housed on the current website for The Immediate Gratification Players, a student improvisational comedy group of which Mollick was a member and which hosted the original site.

The project grew to considerable size since web surfers were invited to submit translations. The phrase was translated into over 150 languages, including some that are fictional or invented, as well as into code from various computer languages. It became an Internet meme.

== See also ==
- "Dirty Hungarian Phrasebook", Monty Python's Flying Circus sketch
- My postillion has been struck by lightning, phrase attributed to interlingual guide books notorious for its improbable specificity
