= Ethan Mollick =

American AI and education researcher

Ethan Mollick is a Wharton associate professor, artificial intelligence (AI) researcher, and the author of New York Times bestseller Co-Intelligence. His work focuses primarily on the impact of AI on work and education, and he was named one of TIME Magazine's Most Influential People in Artificial Intelligence of 2024.

== Early life and education ==
Mollick was born in Milwaukee, Wisconsin, in 1975. He attended Harvard University, where he completed his bachelor's degree in 1997. While at Harvard, he created a website that compiled translations of I Can Eat Glass. He later earned his MBA and PhD from the MIT Sloan School of Management in 2004 and 2010, respectively. His doctoral thesis was titled Essays on individuals and organizations and was supervised by researcher Ezra Zuckerman.

During his time as a student and PhD candidate, Mollick studied innovation and entrepreneurship, publishing research on topics like Moore's law and co-authoring a 2008 book with David Edery titled Changing the Game: How Videogames are Transforming the Business World.

== Career and research ==
After completing his graduate studies, Mollick co‑founded eMeta Corporation, a technology startup where he served as vice president of business development.

Following this, Mollick transitioned into academia, joining the Wharton School at the University of Pennsylvania, where he currently serves as associate professor of management. There, Mollick teaches courses on entrepreneurship, innovation, and the impact of emerging technologies in business. He also serves as co-director of Wharton's Generative AI Labs with his wife Lilach Mollick.

Mollick's research investigates topics including crowdfunding dynamics, the adoption of generative AI in organizations, and the influence of individuals on innovation processes. He explores how new technologies shape work and learning, writing, and speaking on topics such as the effects of AI on teamwork and AI-based educational tools.

In addition to his academic work, Mollick advises startups, corporations, and government entities. In 2023, before Joe Biden signed Executive Order 14110, he advised the President's Intelligence Advisory Board on the nature of AI.

In 2024, Mollick published Co‑Intelligence: Living and Working with AI. It is a New York Times Best Seller. The book, which focuses on generative AI, particularly large language models, is intended for those who are unaware of how AI models work and their potential applications. In 2026, he published Co-existence: the Next Phase of AI.

== Personal life ==
Mollick married his wife Lilach Mollick after meeting her while working for eMeta in New York. Together they have two children.
