= Postilion =

Rider of horse while driving a carriage

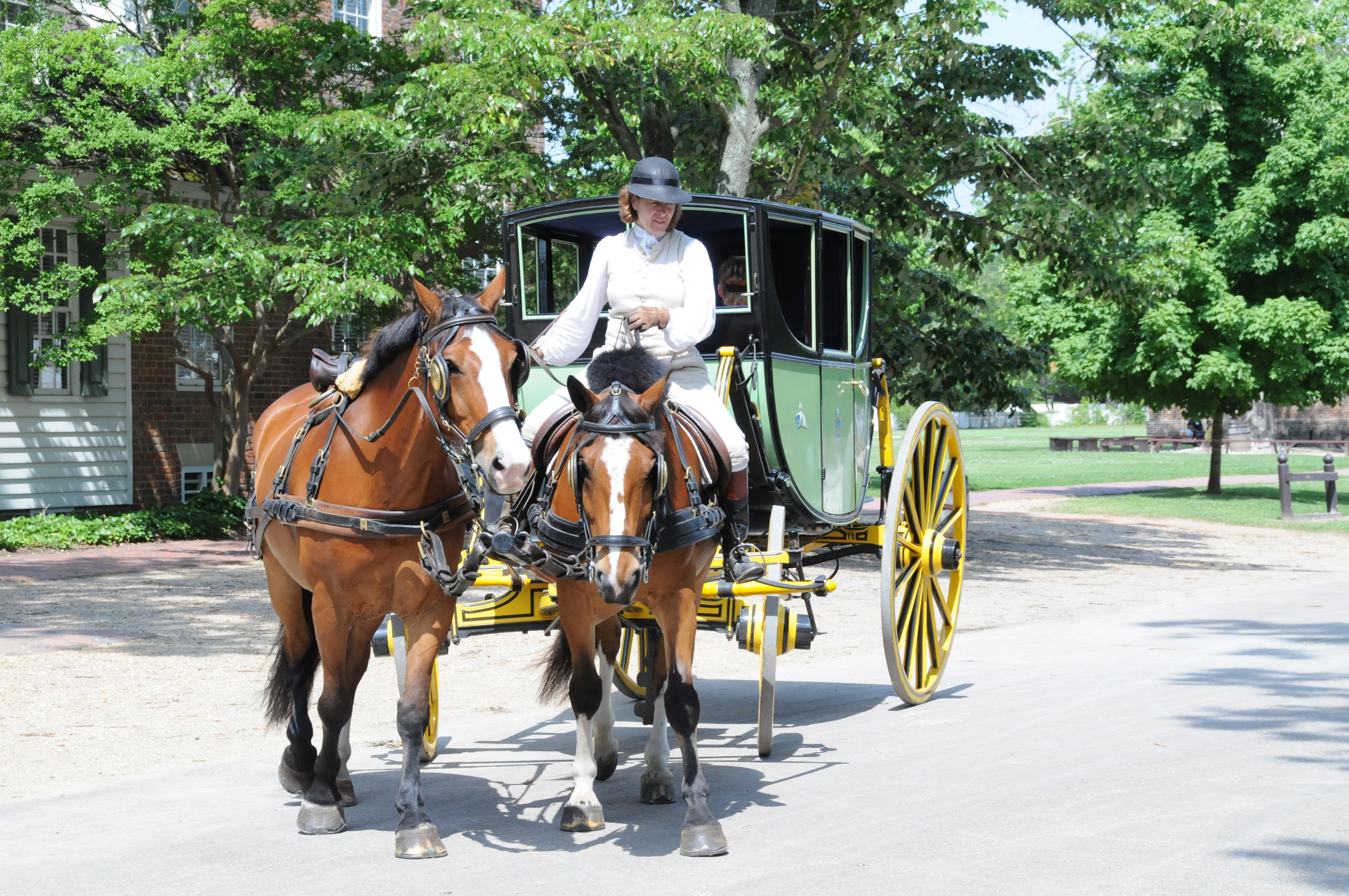
This coach, designed without a driver's seat, is guided by a postilion riding the left-side horse.

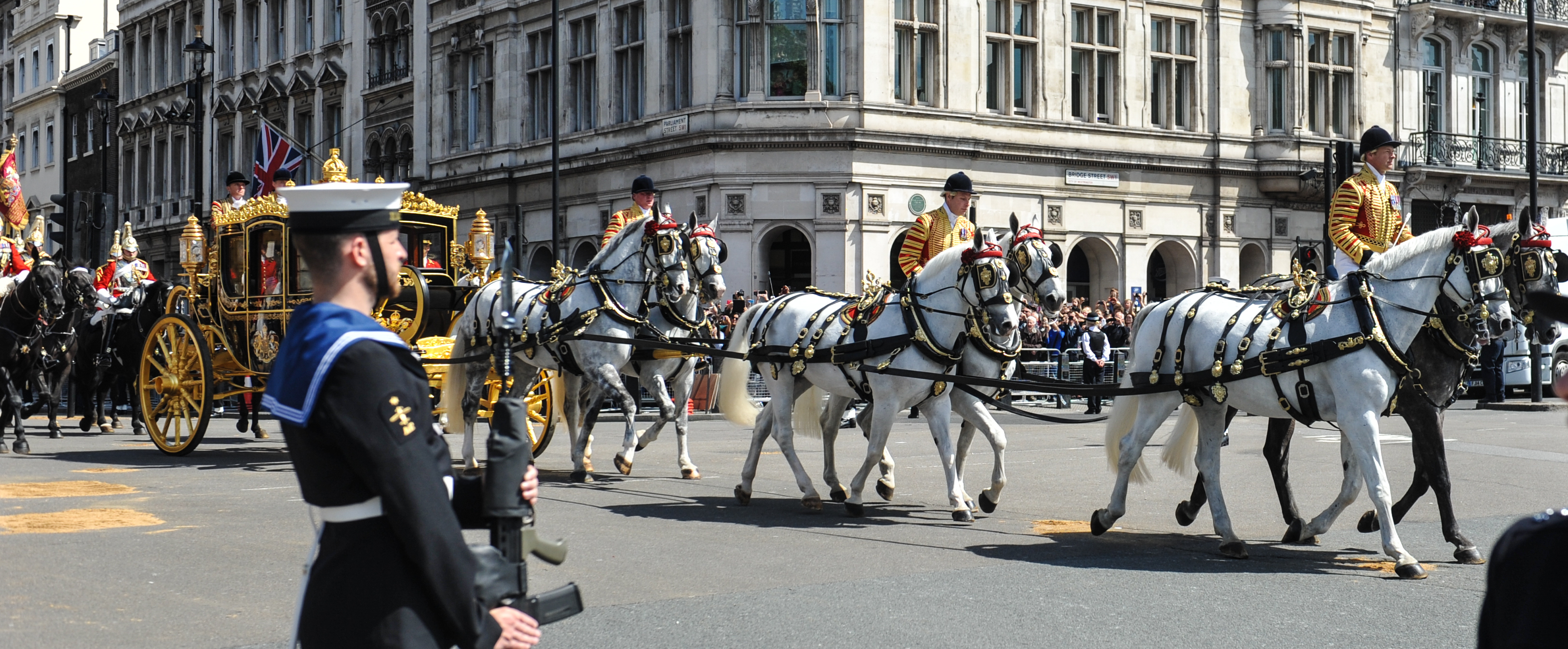
Postilions control the horses drawing the Queen's coach at the State Opening of Parliament, London 2015.

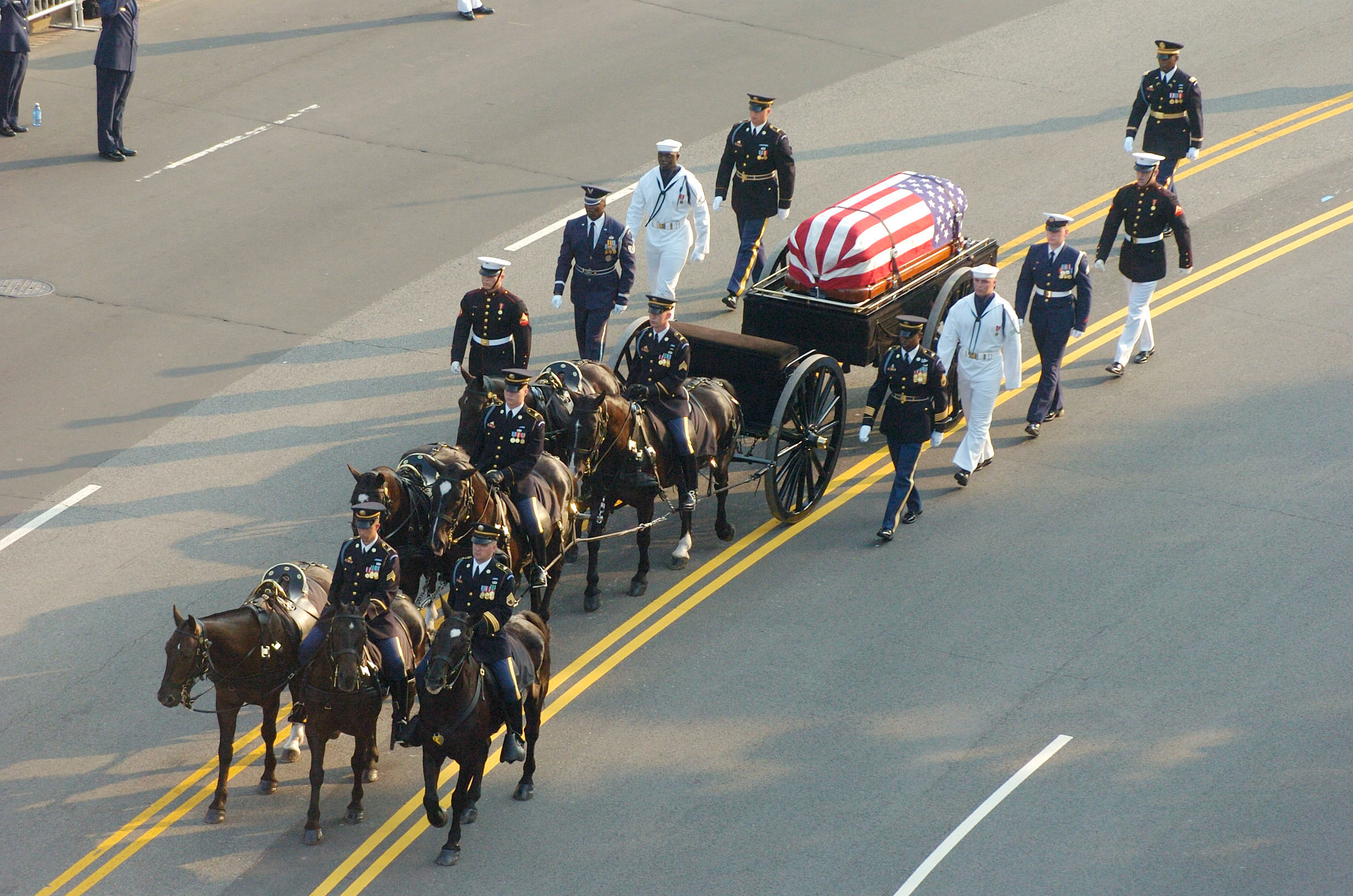
Postilions at the state funeral of Ronald Reagan, 2004

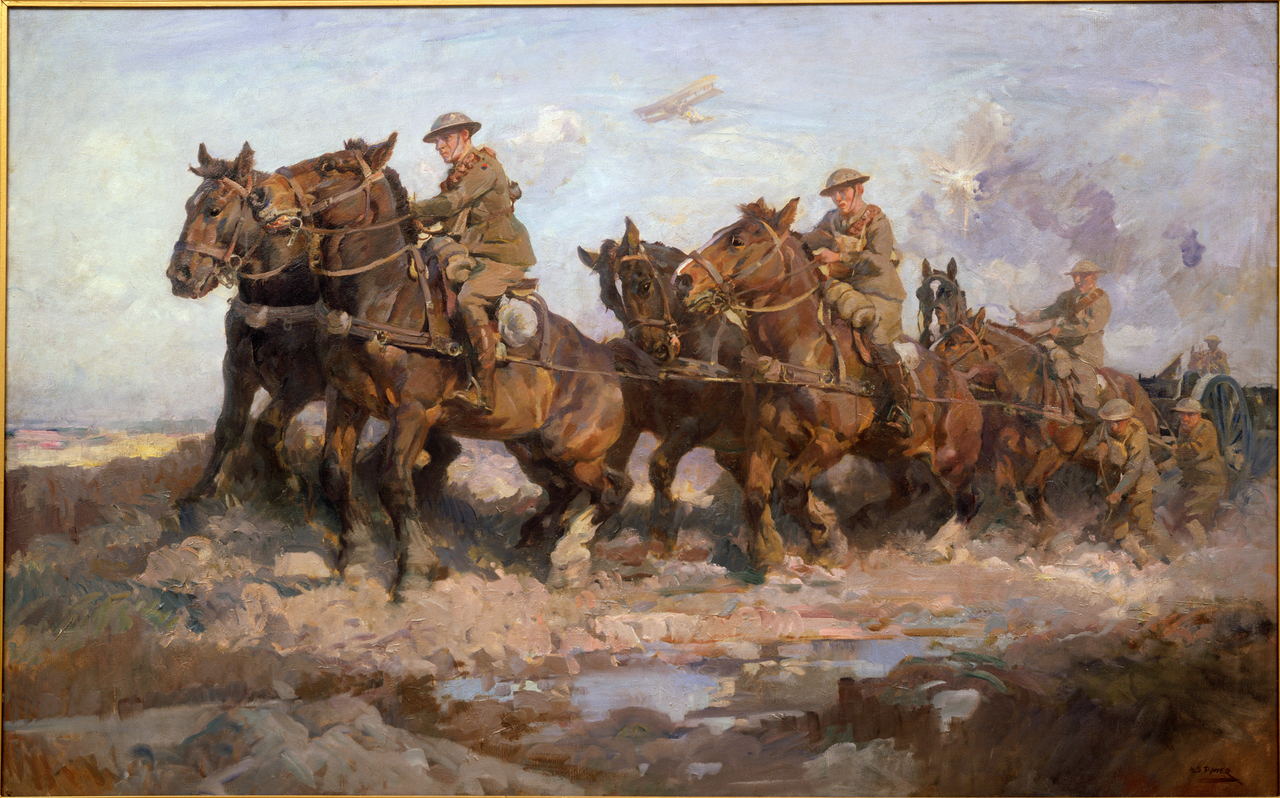
ANZAC horses and postilions struggle to move a gun, Passchendaele, 1917, by Harold Septimus Power.

A postilion or postillion is a person who rides a harnessed horse that is pulling a horse-drawn vehicle such as a coach, rather than driving from behind as a coachman does. This method is used for pulling wheeled vehicles that do not have a driver's seat, such as many ceremonial state coaches and artillery limbers and caissons. Postilion riders are generally arranged one rider for each pair of horses, riding the left horse.

Originally the English name for a guide or forerunner for the post (mail) or a messenger, it became transferred to the actual mail carrier or messenger and also to a person who rides a (hired) post horse. The same persons made themselves available as a less expensive alternative to hiring a coachman, particularly for light, fast vehicles.

A carriage or coach that was arranged without a driver's seat and intended for guidance by postilions, had à la Daumont appended, such as "coach à la Daumont". Daumont is a corruption of the French d'Aumont from the 8th Duke of Aumont who preferred this manner of travel.

== Mount ==
Postilions ride the left or nearside (Note: Because horses are mounted from the horse's left side (the horse prefers no surprises) that side is nearest to the rider. The postilion rides the left horse of the pair because there is no access to the right-hand horse from its left-hand side.) mount because horses are mounted from the left. With a double team there could be two postilions, one for each pair, or, especially in France, one postilion would ride on the left wheel (rear) horse in order to control all four horses.

== Livery ==
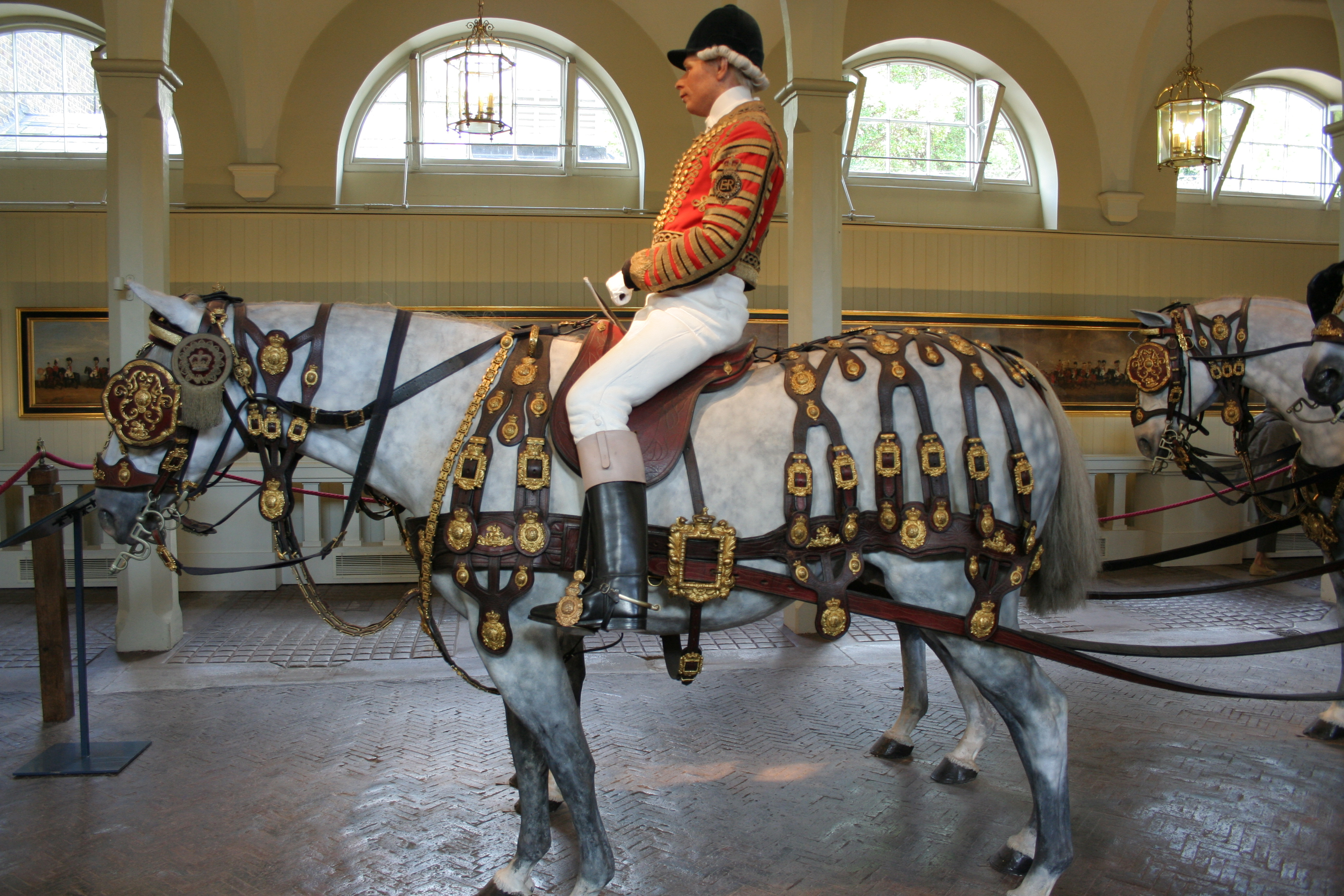
Royal Mews postilion livery

The postilion wears a full-dress livery with a short jacket reaching to the waist only and decorated with gold lace and gilt buttons. A white shirt and stock tie, white leather breeches, white gloves, decorated cap, boots with brown tops, and an iron leg-guard on the [right] leg to protect it from the battering of the carriage pole.

— Thomas Ryder in Fashion on Wheels

== Purposes ==
- Privacy for passengers in their conversations.
- Better visibility of the carriage and its occupants: important royal weddings in England use the 1902 postillion state landau rather than a state landau with a box for the coachman; state funerals use postillions to draw the hearse.
- Better control of the horses, for example, when moving guns at high speed on a battlefield.

== Travel by post ==
This style of travel was known as "posting". The postilions and their horses (known as "post-horses") would be hired from a "postmaster" at a "post house". The carriage would travel from one post house to the next (a journey known as a "stage"), where the postilions and/or spent (exhausted) horses could be replaced if necessary. In practice unless a return hire was anticipated a postilion of a spent team frequently was also responsible for returning them to the originating post house.

Posting was once common both in England and in continental Europe. In addition to a carriage's obvious advantages (a degree of safety and shelter for the inside passengers and accessibility to non-riders) on long trips it tended to be the most rapid form of passenger travel. Individually mounted riders are subject to their personal endurance limits, while posting could continue indefinitely with brief stops for fresh horses and crew. In England, posting declined once railways became an alternative method of transport, but it remained popular in France and other countries.

== Artillery ==
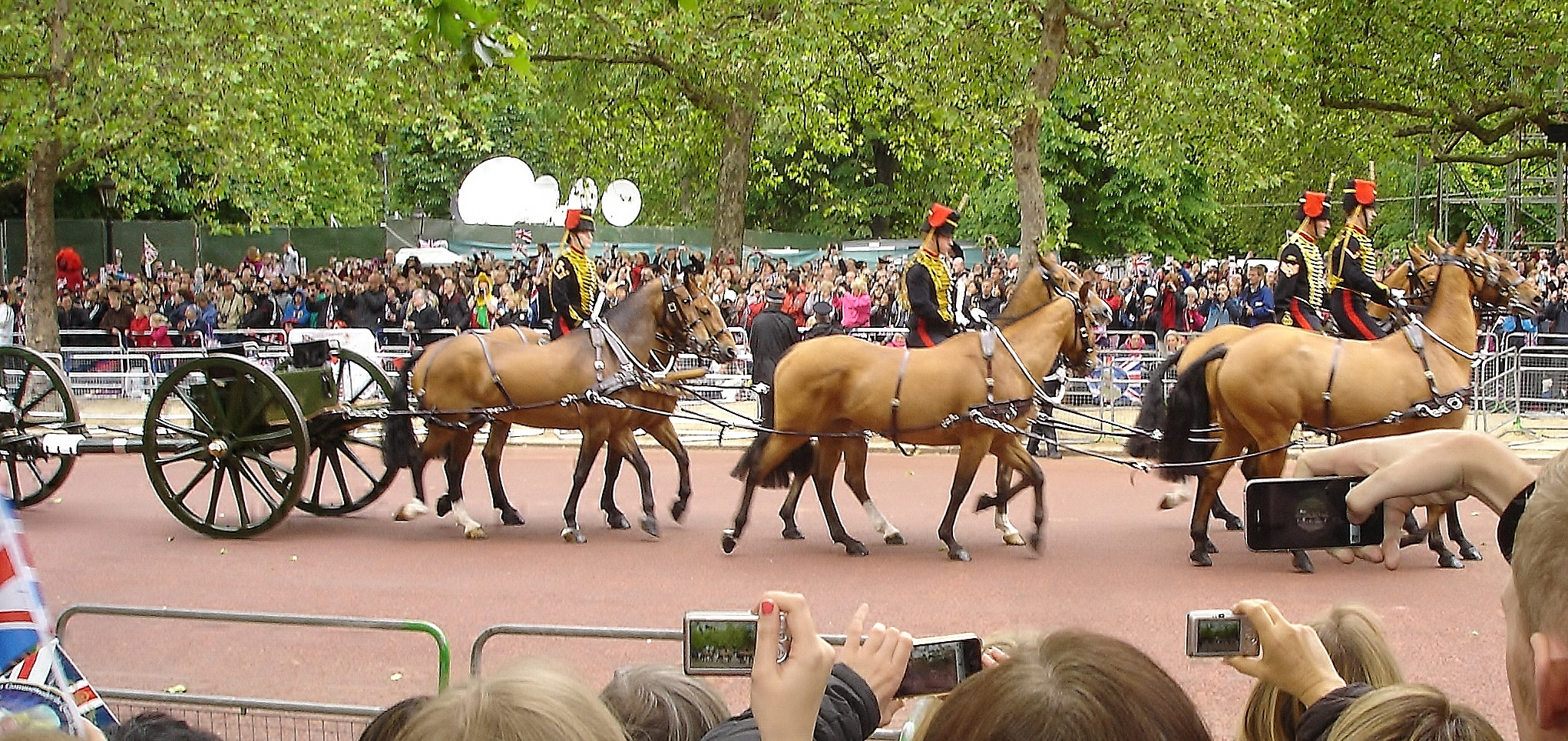
King's Troop, Royal Horse Artillery

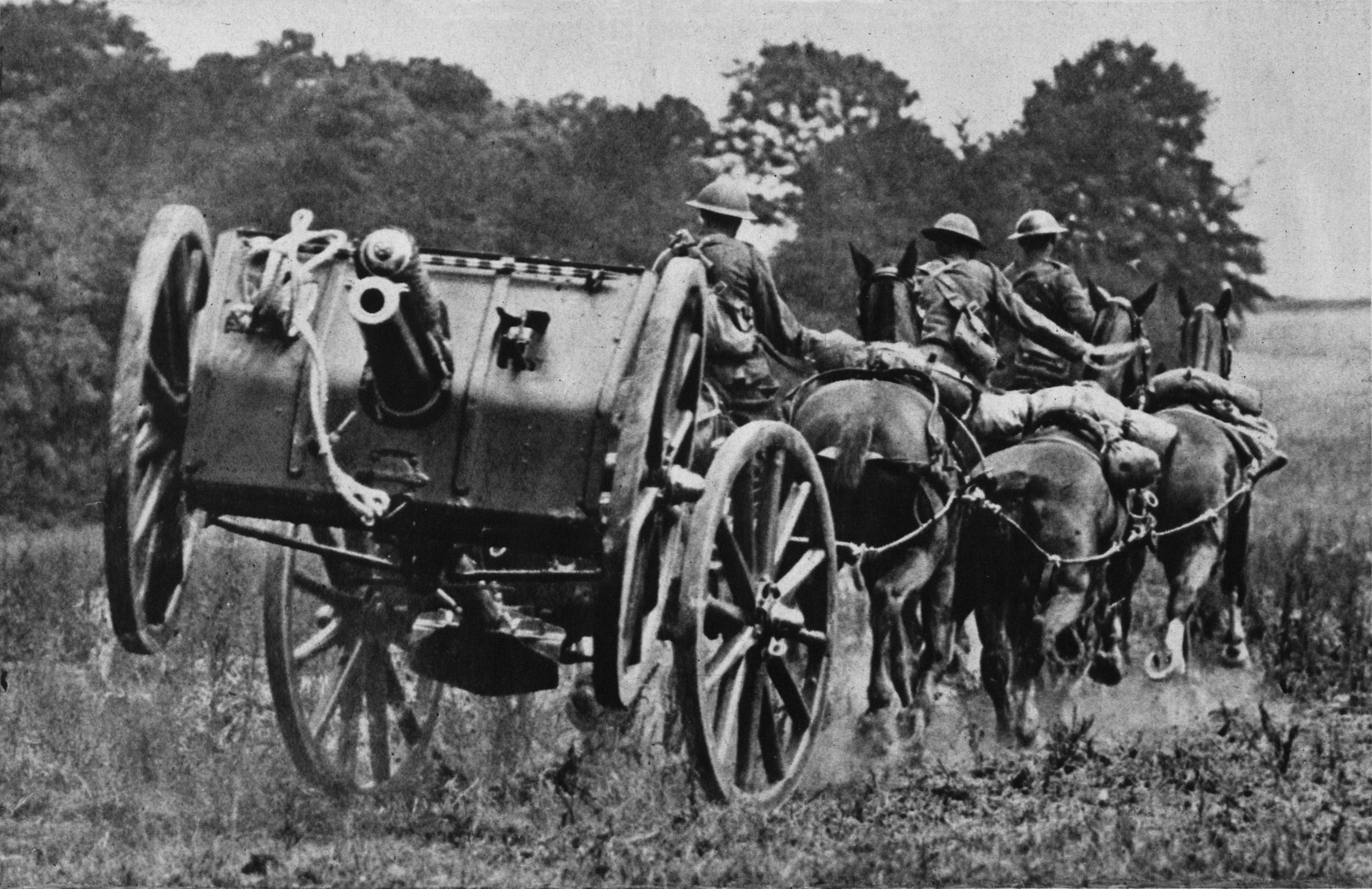
Six-horse Royal Horse Artillery team with 13-pounder cannon at speed during the First World War

The gun detachments of the King's Troop, Royal Horse Artillery are each driven by a team of three post riders. The King's Troop is a ceremonial unit equipped with World War I veteran 13-pounder field guns drawn by six horses in much the same configuration as the guns of the 19th and early 20th century would have been. Officers and senior non-commissioned officers ride separately.

The United States Army's Old Guard Caisson Platoon also rides postilion. The section sergeant, on a separate horse, is in charge of the team and there are six other horses teamed together. This configuration is used at Arlington National Cemetery.

== Derivative terminology and use ==
To adapt to the rigours of horses travelling long distances at a trot, postillion riders adapted a method of rising and falling with the rhythm of the horse's gait and given the name "posting" or "posting to the trot."

== See also ==
- Le postillon de Lonjumeau, an 1836 French comic opera by Adolphe Adam.
- "My postillion has been struck by lightning". A comical phrase supposedly found in old-fashioned foreign language phrase books. It was adapted by Dirk Bogarde as the title of his first autobiographical memoir (1977).
- Der Postillon, German satirical news site.
