= Coachman =

Driver of a horse-drawn passenger vehicle

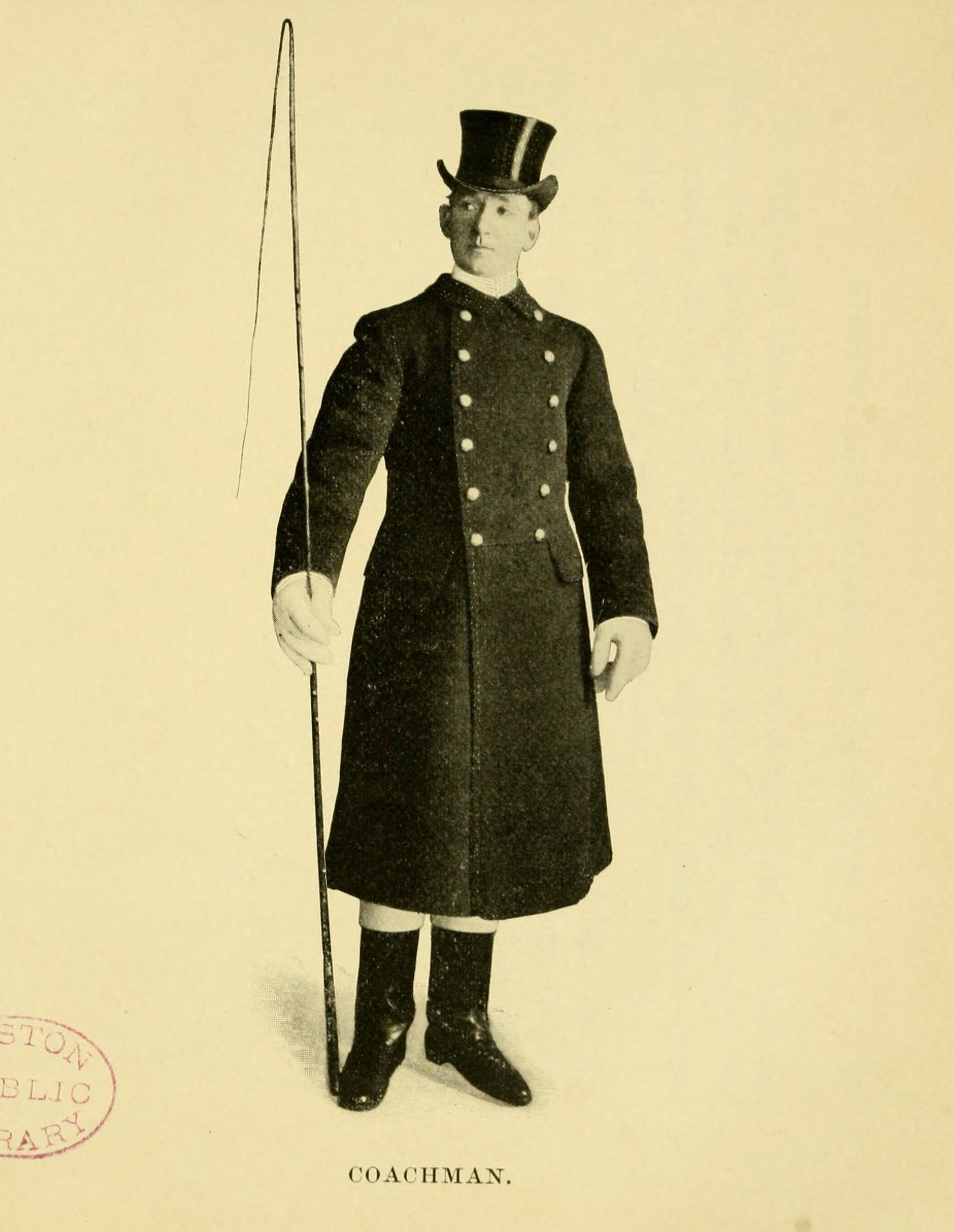
Coachman, Boston MA 1902

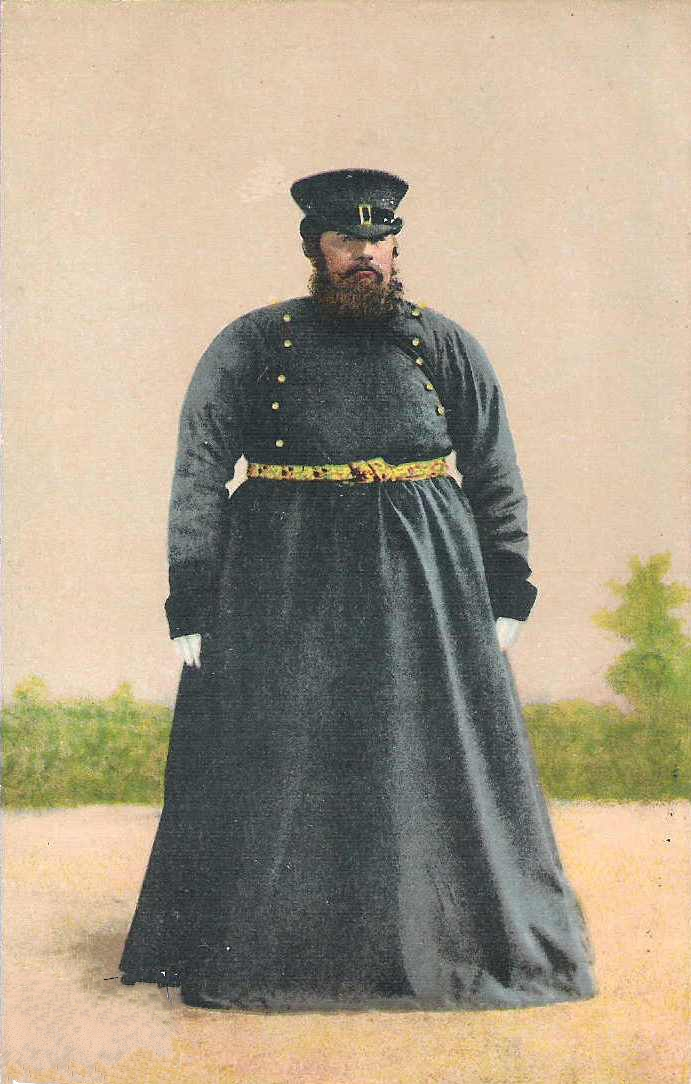
Russian coachman, before 1917 — his belt indicates his master's wealth

A coachman is a person who drives a coach or carriage, or similar horse-drawn vehicle. A coachman has also been called a coachee, coachy, whip, or hackman.

The coachman's first concern is to remain in full control of the horses (or other similar animals such as mules) and another employee, traditionally a footman, would accompany the coach to handle any circumstances beyond the coachman's control.

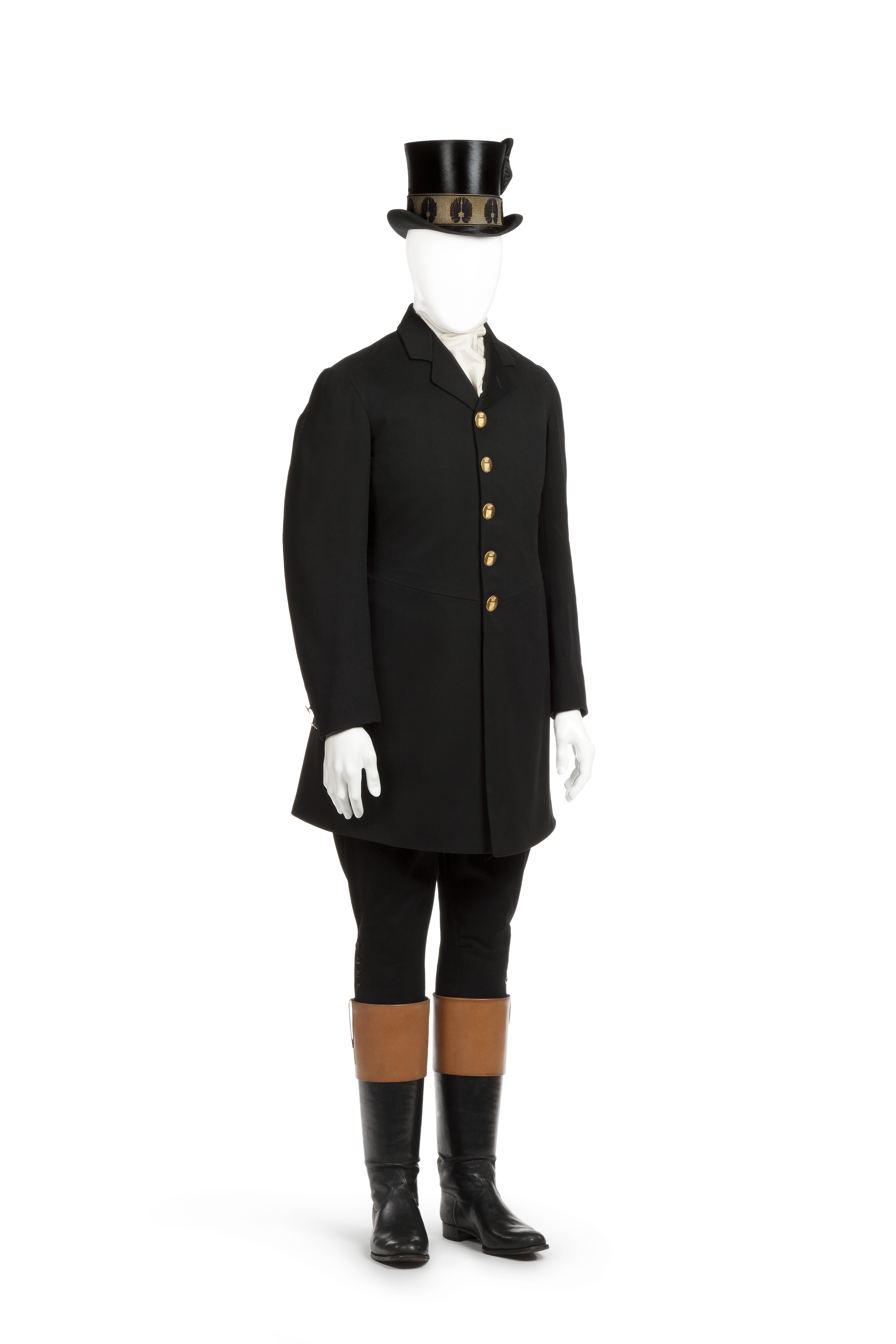
Swedish livery for footmen

== Duties ==
"Coachman" is correctly applied to the driver of any type of coach or carriage having an independent seat for the driver. If it is a public transport vehicle the owners might arrange things differently and a coachman may do no more than drive the vehicle. A private coachman reports directly to his employer or the employer's agent or factor and, being in command of the stables, the most important building after the house, is responsible for caring for and providing all the master's horses and carriages and related employees. Where necessary the coachman may delegate the driving of household vehicles but it is a primary duty to personally drive the employer. In a great house, this would have been a specialty, but in more modest households, the "coachman" would have doubled as the stablehand or groom. Even a head chauffeur with under-chauffeurs and mechanics held a much lesser position needing such a small staff and little capital.

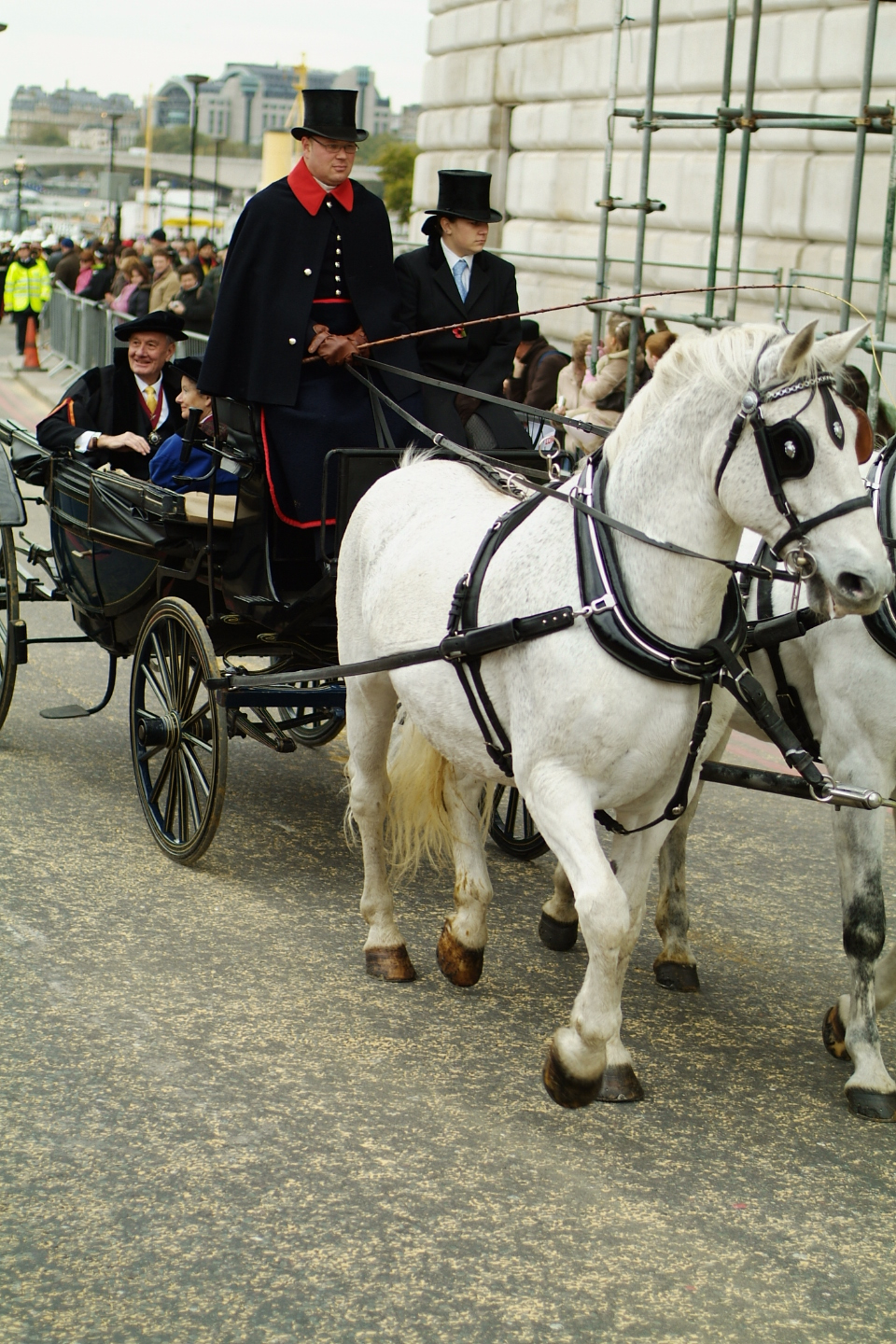
Coachman, footman and landau carriage

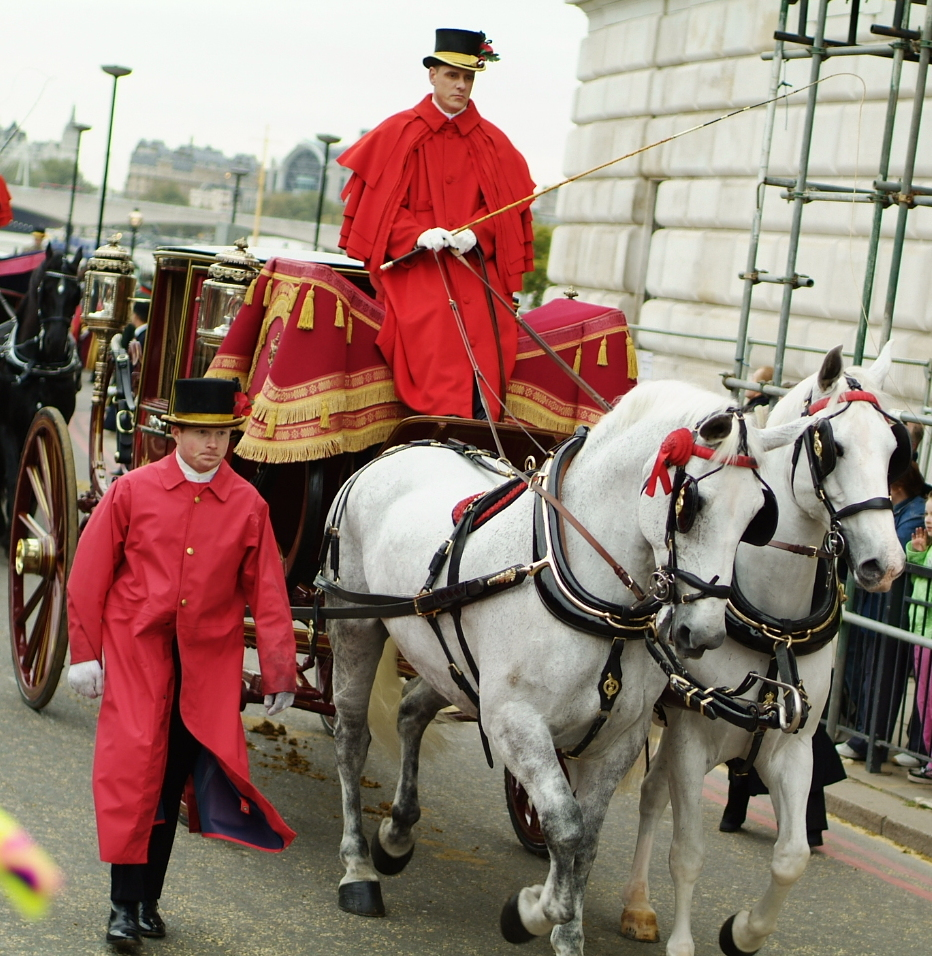
Coachman, footman on foot. The coach carries a splendid hammercloth

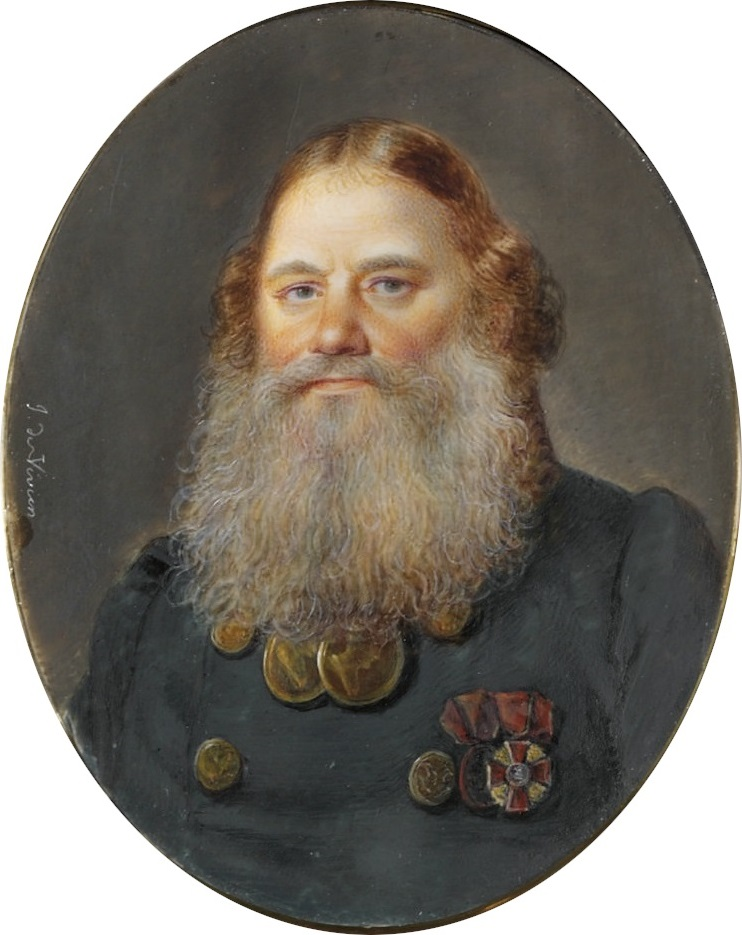
Ilya Baykov, personal coachman of Alexander I of Russia

In early coaches he sat on a built-in compartment called a boot, bracing his feet on a footrest called a footboard. He was often pictured wearing a box coat or box jacket, a heavy overcoat with or without shoulder capes, double-breasted, with fitted waist and wide lapels; its name derives from its use by coachmen riding on the box seat, exposed to all kinds of weather. An ornamented, often fringed cloth called a hammercloth might have hung over the coachman's seat, especially of a ceremonial coach. He could be seen taking refreshments at a type of public house called a watering house, which also provided water for horses.

The role of the coachman, who sat on the vehicle, was contrasted with that of the postillion mounted directly on one of the drawing horses. On the grandest ceremonial occasions the coachman might escort a number of his postillions with his own horse.

=== Bynames ===
A coachman was sometimes called a jarvey or jarvie, especially in Ireland; Jarvey was a nickname for Jarvis. In the first of his Sherlock Holmes stories, A Study in Scarlet, Arthur Conan Doyle refers to the driver of a small cab in London as a jarvey. A coachman who drove dangerously fast or recklessly might invoke biblical or mythological allusions: Some referred to him as a jehu, recalling King Jehu of Israel, who was noted for his furious attacks in a chariot (2 Kings 9:20) before he died about 816 BC. Others dubbed him a Phaeton, harking back to the Greek Phaëton, son of Helios who, attempting to drive the chariot of the sun, managed to set the earth on fire.

The driver of a wagon or cart drawn by a draught animal was known as teamster or carter.

== Hungarian folklore ==
The English word coach, the Spanish and Portuguese coche, the German Kutsche, the Slovak koč and the Czech kočár all probably derive from the Hungarian word "kocsi", literally meaning "of Kocs". Kocs (pronounced "kotch") was a Hungarian post town, and the coach itself may have been developed in Hungary. Hungarian villages still hold Coachman of the Year competitions (similar to those held in Zakopane in Poland).

The coachman soon became a prominent figure in Hungarian folklore. As the Clever Coachman (tudós kocsis), he turns up unexpectedly in the hero's life, either knowing his name or naming him by his true name. Many of Steven Brust's novels play with this image of the coachman.

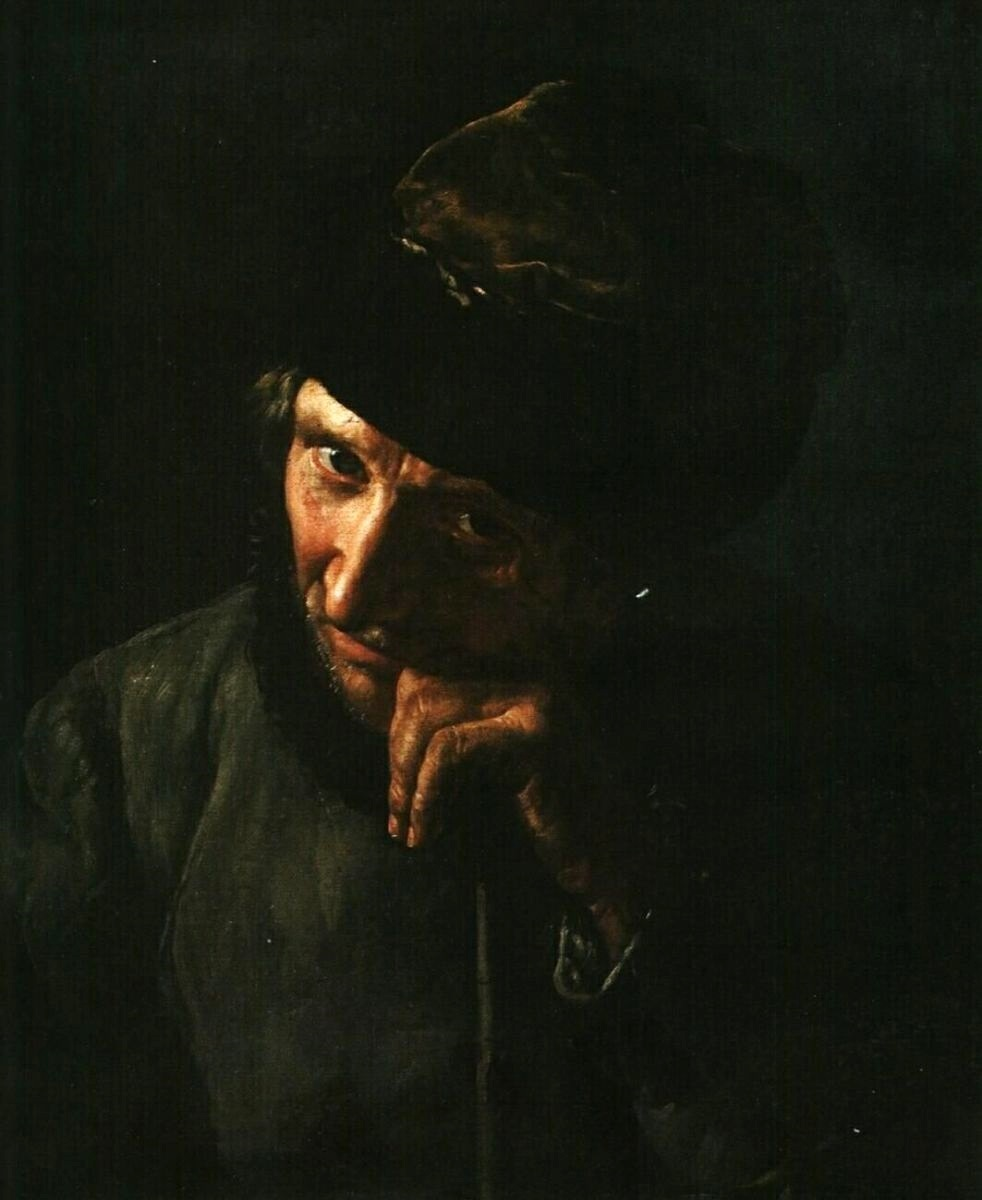
A Russian coachman ("yamshik", Russian: ямщик) leaning on a whip-handle. A painting by Vasily Tropinin, circa 1820.
