= Elvin (given name) =

Male given name

- Gender: Male

Other gender
- Feminine: Elvina

Other names
- Variant form: Alvin

Elvin is a male given name.

In the Balkans, Elvin is popular among Bosniaks in the former Yugoslav nations. It is also popular among Albanians. The name is a modification to the name Alvin, another popular name among the group. Its popularity among these communities is likely due to its similarity to Eldin, a name also shared by many in the region.

Elvin is also popular in Turkey, Azerbaijan and Iran as a male name. It means Great Of Clan in Turkish.

== Given name ==
- Elvin (bishop of Várad) (fl. 1189–1200), Hungarian prelate
- Elvin Aliyev, multiple people
- Elvin Astanov (born 1979), Azerbaijani Paralympic athlete
- Elvin Ayala (born 1981), American boxer
- Elvin Badalov (born 1995), Azerbaijani footballer
- Elvin Bale born in London, England, was a world-famous daredevil with Ringling Bros
- Elvin Barr (1908–1985), Australian rules footballer
- Elvin Beqiri (born 1980), Albanian footballer
- Elvin Berridge (born 1989), Kittitian cricketer
- Elvin Bethea (born 1946), former American football defensive end
- Elvin Bishop (born 1942), American blues and rock and roll musician and guitarist
- Elvin Butcher (1907–1957), American football and basketball player
- Elvin Cafarguliyev (born 2000), Azerbaijani footballer
- Elvin Camalov (born 1995), Azerbaijani footballer
- Elvin J. Cassell (1896–1970), American football coach in the United States
- Elvin Chia (born 1977), Malaysian swimmer
- Elvin W. Crane (1853–1909), American lawyer and Democratic party politician from New Jersey
- Elvin C. Drake (1903–1988), American college track and field coach and athletics trainer
- Elvin Feltner, (1929—2013), American film producer, television broadcaster and telecommunications entrepreneur
- Elvin Grey, (born 1989), Russian musician
- Elvin J. Hansen (born 1950), Danish politician
- Elvin Hasan (born 1985), Macedonian politician
- Elvin Hayes (born 1945), retired American basketball player and radio analyst
- Elvin R. Heiberg III (1932–2013) United States Army general
- Elvin Hutchison (1912–2001), American football player and official
- Elvin Ibrisimovic (born 1999), Austrian footballer
- Elvin Ivory (born 1948), American basketball player
- Elvin Jamalov (born 1995), Azerbaijani footballer
- Elvin Jones (1927–2004), jazz drummer of the post-bop era
- Elvin A. Kabat (1914–2000), American biomedical scientist
- Elvin Mamishzada (born 1991), Azerbaijani boxer
- Elvin Mammadov (born 1988), Azerbaijani footballer
- Elvin Martinez (born 1934), American politician from Florida
- Elvin Mendy (born 2002), Gambian footballer
- Elvin Mesger (1919–1988), holder of the American Bowling Congress record for 800-or-better series
- Elvin Mims (born 1979), American professional basketball player
- Elvin Mursaliyev (born 1988), Azerbaijani Greco-Roman wrestler
- Elvin Ng (born 1980), actor in the Mediacorp stable in Singapore
- Elvin Nimrod (1943–2021), politician from the island of Grenada
- Elvin Oliva (born 1997), Honduran footballer
- Elvin Papik, the 26th head football coach for the Doane College Tigers located in Crete, Nebraska
- Elvin Penner, Belizean politician
- Elvin Ramírez (born 1987), Major League Baseball pitcher for the Washington Nationals
- Elvin Rodríguez (born 1998), Dominican baseball pitcher
- Elvin Santos (born 1963), Vice President of Honduras 2006–2008
- Merton Elvin Scott, Canadian politician
- Elvin Semrad (1909–1976), American psychiatrist
- Elvin C. Stakman (1885–1979), American plant pathologist
- Elvin Tibideaux, fictional character on The Cosby Show
- Elvin Yunusov (born 1994), Azerbaijani football player

== See also ==
- Elvin, distributed event routing service using a publish/subscribe event delivery model
- Elvin (surname)
