= Francisco Diaz =

Francisco Diaz may refer to:

- José and Francisco Díaz, members of the Puerto Rican Militia who defended Puerto Rico from a British invasion in 1797
- Francisco Domingo Díaz, 19th century governor of San Juan Province, Argentina
- Francisco Diaz-Silveira (1871–1925), Cuban journalist, writer and poet
- Francisco Díaz de León (1897–1975), Mexican engraver
- Francisco Diaz-Silveira Lopez (1908–1996), attorney
- Frank Diaz-Silveira (born 1936), Florida attorney, anti-Castro Cuban militant
- Francisco Díaz Muñoz (born 1992), Spanish politician
- Francisco Estévez Diaz, Spanish composer
- Francisco Bustillos Diaz, better known by screen name Paquito Diaz (1937–2011), Filipino actor and movie director
- Francisco Javier Díaz Madriz, director-general of the Nicaraguan National Police
- Francisco José Díaz (born 1982), Honduran footballer
