= Tamargo =

Tamargo is a surname. The name originated as a habitational surname for a place called Tamargo in Las Regueras, Asturias. Notable people with the surname include:

- Deborah Tamargo (born 1948), Florida politician
- Domingo Tamargo (1883-1947), Cuban minister and Supreme Court justice
- Eva Tamargo (born 1960), American actress
- Francisco Diaz-Silveira Tamargo (born 1936), Cuban-American lawyer and politician
- Georgina García y Tamargo (1938–2022), birth name of Cuban-Mexican actress Gina Romand
- John Tamargo (born 1951), American baseball player and coach
- José Luis Luege Tamargo (born 1953), Mexican politician
- Margarita Tamargo-Sanchez (1915–2005), Cuban-born American pharmacist and bacteriologist
- Maria C. Tamargo (born 1951), Cuban-American scientist
- Mauricio J. Tamargo (born 1957), Cuban-born American government official
