= Elvin =

Elvin may refer to:

- Elvin (given name)
- Elvin (surname)
- Elvin (service), a distributed event routing service
- Elvin!, a 1968 album by Elvin Jones

== See also ==
- Alvin (disambiguation)
- Elfin (disambiguation)
- Elvan (disambiguation)
- Elven (disambiguation)
