= Elfvin =

Elfvin is a surname. Notable people with the surname include:

- Bayard Elfvin (born 1981), American soccer player
- John T. Elfvin (1917–2009), American lawyer and jurist
- Monica Elfvin (born 1938), Swedish gymnast

== See also ==
- Elvin (disambiguation)
