= List of Macedonian Turks =

This is a list of notable Macedonian Turks.

== Academia ==
- Sadettin Dilbilgen, Ottoman and Turkish philatelist.

== Arts and literature ==
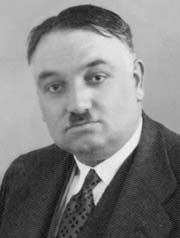
Yahya Kemal Beyatlı

- Yahya Kemal Beyatlı, Ottoman and Turkish poet and author
- Alaettin Tahir, author, researcher and journalist

== Business ==
- Şarık Tara, billionaire; founder of Enka İnşaat ve Sanayi A.Ş.

== Cinema and television ==
- Filiz Ahmet, Macedonian and Turkish actress
- Sabina Ajrula, actress
- Pelin Akil, Turkish actress (maternally of Turkish Macedonian origin)
- Özgü Namal, Turkish actress (Turkish Macedonian father)
- Muhterem Nur, actress and pop singer
- Ertan Saban, actor
- Erman Saban, actor
- Leyla Sayar, actress, author, ballerina, beauty queen, and singer (Turkish Macedonian father)

== Military ==
- Tekin Arıburun, chief commander of the Turkish Air Force
- Huseyin Avni, commander of the 57th Infantry Regiment of the Ottoman Army at Gallipoli
- Kâzım Dirik, officer of the Ottoman Army and a general of the Turkish Army
- Naci Eldeniz, officer of the Ottoman Army, a general of the Turkish Army, and a politician of the Republic of Turkey
- Akif Erdemgil, officer of the Ottoman Army and a general of the Turkish Army
- Mehmet Suphi Kula, officer of the Ottoman Army and a general of the Turkish Army
- Süleyman Sabri Pasha, officer of the Ottoman Army and a general of the Turkish Army
- Tahsin Yazıcı, Turkish army officer
- Hüseyin Avni Zaimler, officer of the Ottoman Army, a general of the Turkish Army, and a politician of the Republic of Turkey
- İlker Başbuğ, 26th Chief of the General Staff of Turkey (Turkish Macedonian parents)

== Music ==
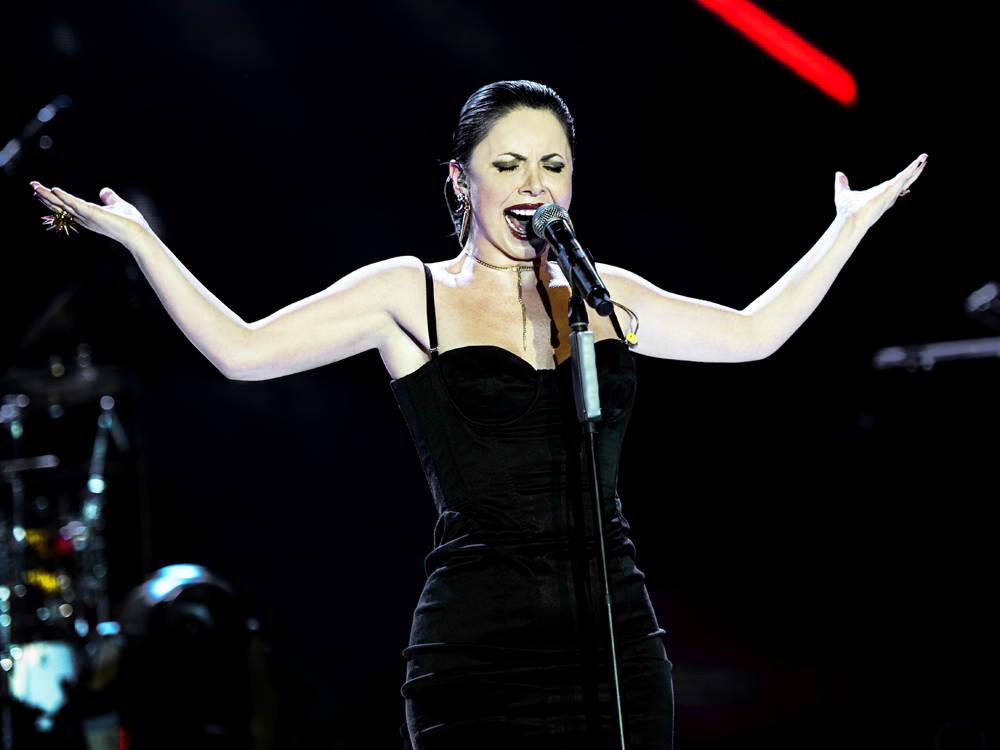
Şebnem Ferah

- Selda Bağcan, Turkish singer (Turkish Macedonian father)
- Ajri Demirovski, singer
- Şebnem Ferah, Turkish singer (Turkish Macedonian parents)
- Mesut Kurtiş, singer
- Sibel Redzep, Swedish singer
- Usnija Redžepova, singer (Turkish mother)

== Politics ==
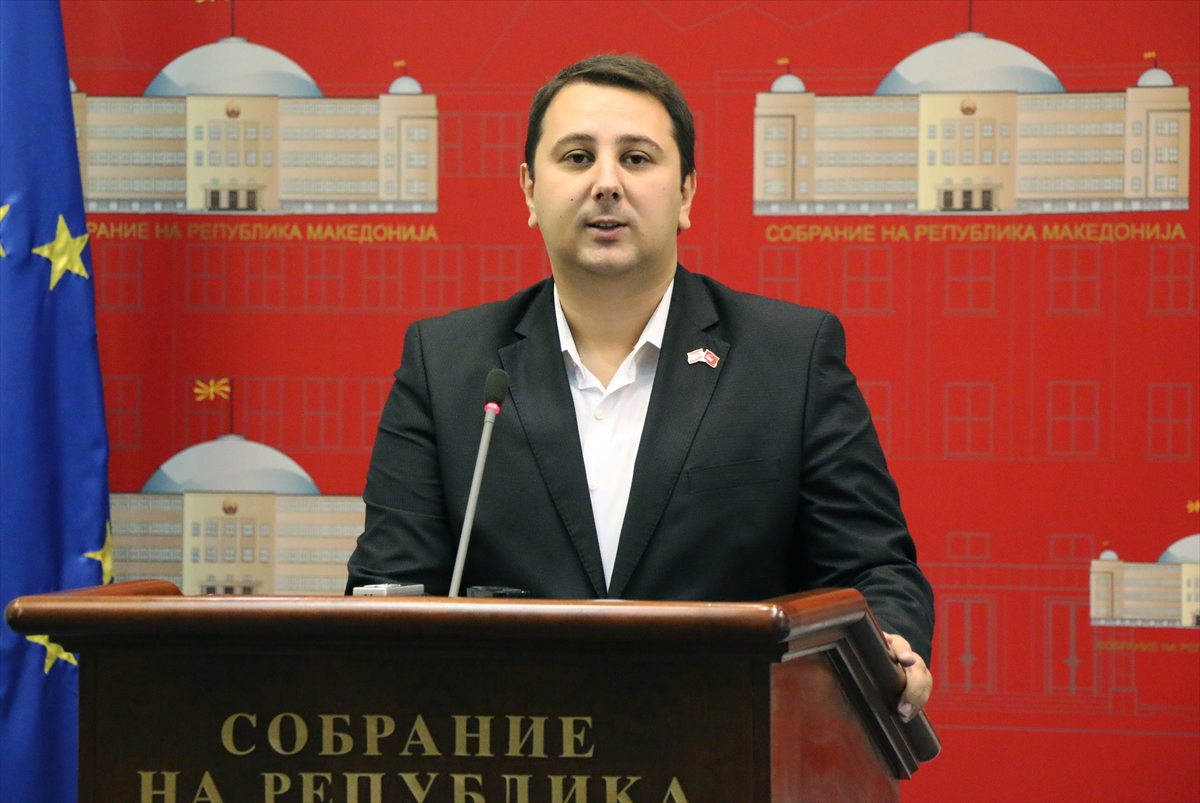
Enes Ibrahim

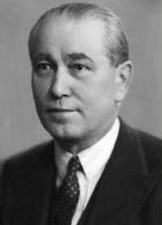
Fethi Okyar

- Tekin Arıburun, the last Turkish president to be born outside the territory of modern-day Turkey
- Ali Rıza Efendi, father of Mustafa Kemal Atatürk (family from the Turkish Macedonian village of Kodžadžik)
- Elvin Hasan, politician and government minister
- Ahmet Necdet Sezer, President of Turkey from 2000 to 2007 (born in Afyonkarahisar to Turkish Macedonian parents from Serres, Central Macedonia, Greece)
- Enes Ibrahim, MP in the Assembly of the Republic of Macedonia (2014–present)
- Srgjan Kerim, diplomat and former President of the United Nations General Assembly
- Ali Fethi Okyar, second Prime Minister of Turkey
- Özgür Özel, current chairman of Republican People's Party (CHP) (Turkish Macedonian father)

== Sports ==
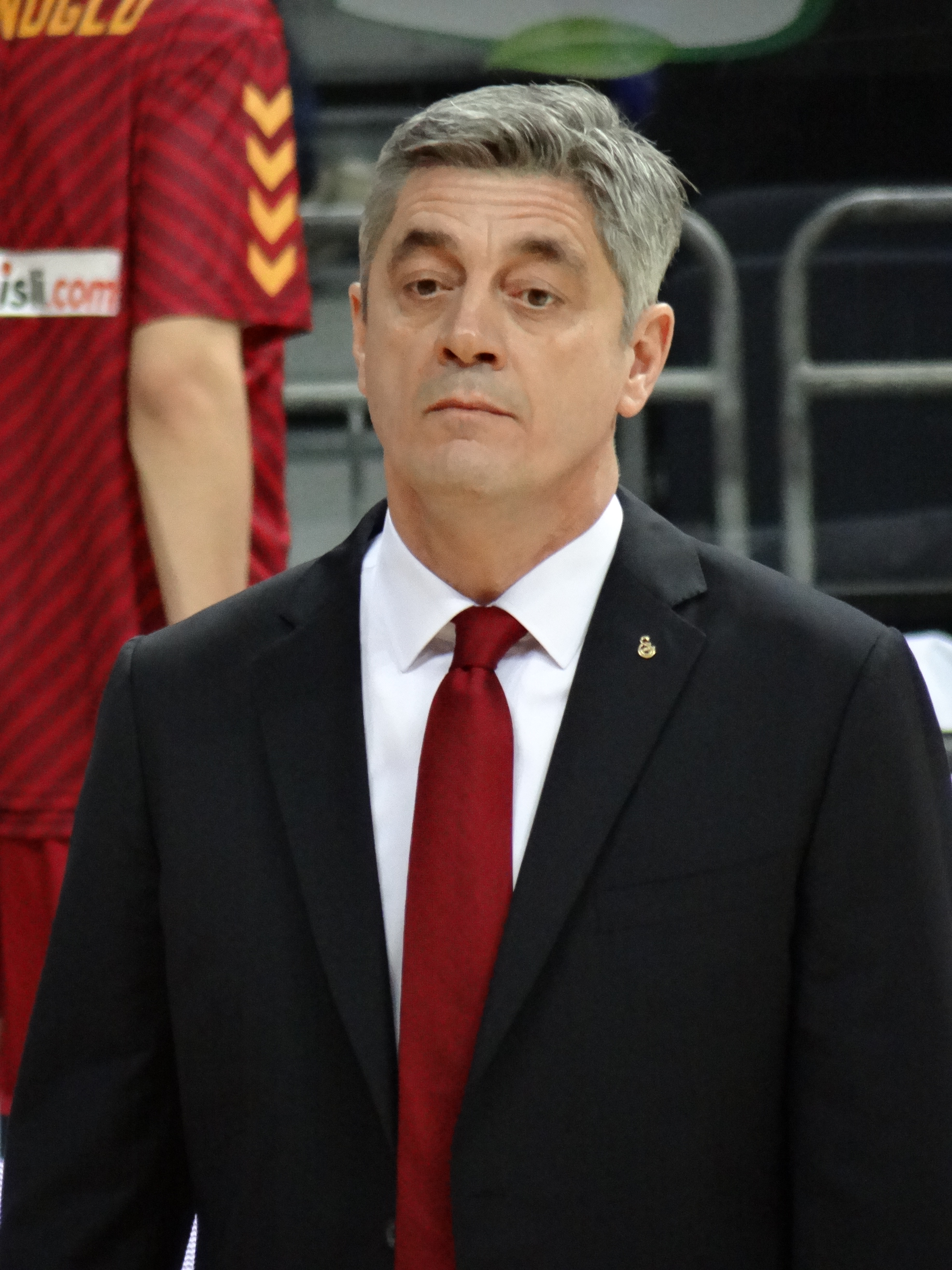
Oktay Mahmuti

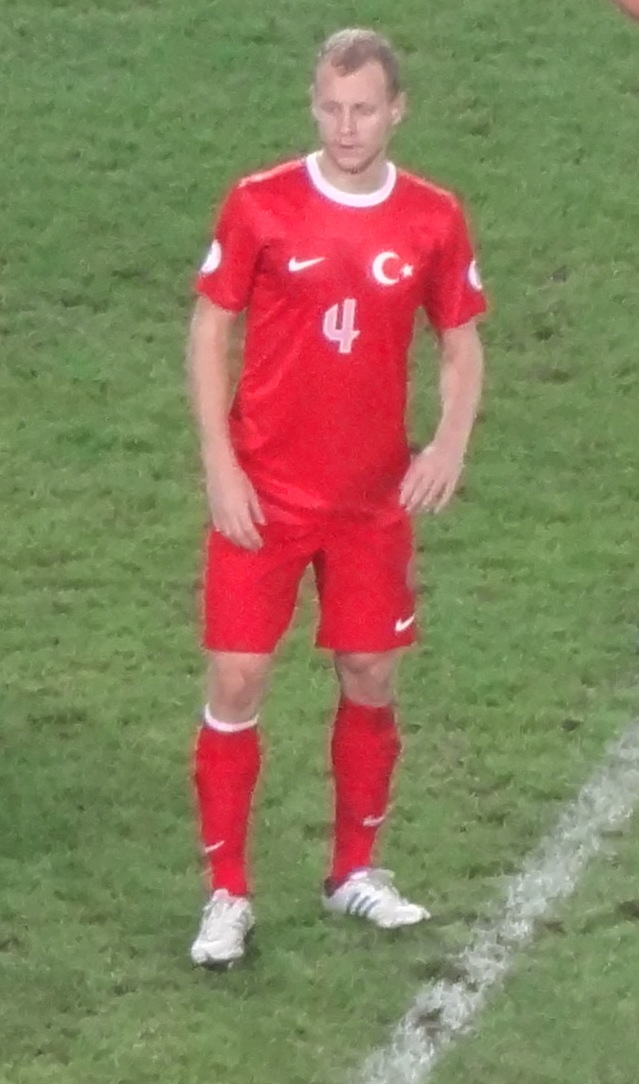
Semih Kaya

- Serdar Aziz, Turkish football player (Turkish Macedonian father)
- Erol Bekir, Swedish football player
- Eljif Elmas, football player
- Ilami Halimi, football player
- Adem İbrahimoğlu, Turkish football player
- Semih Kaya, Turkish football player (Turkish Macedonian grandfather)
- Denis Mahmudov, football player
- Oktay Mahmuti, basketball coach
- Emre Mor, Turkish football player (Turkish Macedonian mother)
- Muarem Muarem, football player
- Caner Osman, Turkish basketball coach (Turkish Macedonian father)
- Cedi Osman, basketball player
- Yksel Osmanovski, Swedish football player
- Erdal Rakip, Swedish football player
- Redžep Selman, Olympic triple jumper
- Ziya Taner, football manager
- Muarem Zekir, football player
- Semih Şentürk, football player

== See also ==
- Turks in North Macedonia
- List of Macedonians
