= Modesto Fernandez Diaz-Silveira =

Cuban politician (born 1946)

Modesto Fernández Díaz-Silveira
- Born: 1946 (age 79–80); Havana, Cuba

Modesto Francisco Fernández Díaz-Silveira (Havana, 1946) is a Cuban expert who participated in several environmental related mechanisms, mainly those within the United Nations.

He was a Senior Scientific Researcher of the “Instituto de Investigaciones Fundamentales para la Agricultura Tropical” (INIFAT) in the Cuban Ministry of Agriculture. He was a member of the United Nations Forum on Forests (UNFF) held in 2003. He has spoken various times at the International Institute for Sustainable Development (IISD) in Canada. He was the Chair of the Third Session of the FAO “International Treaty on Plant Genétic Resources for Food and Agriculture”, from 2008 to 2009, as well as the Vice-Chair for the same International Treaty, representing the Latin American and Caribbean Group (GRULAC), from 2006 to 2009. He got his undergraduate degree in Agricultural Engineering, and his doctorate (PhD) in Agricultural Sciences from the University of Havana. He is the son of Modesto Fernández-Roseñada and Lydia Díaz-Silveira López and the grandson of Francisco Díaz-Silveira. One of his cousins is Francisco Díaz-Silveira Tamargo, an anti-Castro Cuban militant.

== Published works ==
- Fernández, M. (1966): Plant parasitic nematodes, their economic importance in Cuba. Dir. Nac. Ext. y Experim. Agrícola, La Habana, Cuba, 7 pp.
- Tulaganov, A., Baranovskaya, I., Turliguina, E. y Fernández, M. (1966): Cuban Nematodes. Proceedings of the First Latin American Colloquium on Soil Biology. UNESCO. Bahía Blanca, Argentina. pp:182-189.
- Fernández, M. (1967): Lista de nemátodos de Cuba. Revista de Agricultura 1(2):74-88.
- Fernández, M. (1970): Lista de nemátodos fitoparásitos de Cuba (2da Contribución:122 plantas). Serie Agrícola No. 16, Acad. de Ciencias de Cuba, 29pp.
- Fernández M., and P.T.Mijailova (1973): Los nemátodos y su relación con la pudrición del cogollo del cocotero en Cuba. Serie Agrícola No. 29, Acad. de Ciencias de Cuba, 10pp.
- Fernández, M. (1975): El Psidium friedrichstalianum como patrón para guayabo resistente a los nemátodos del género Meloidogyne. Revista de Agricultura 3(3):80-85.
- Fernández, M., Razjivin, A., Ortega, J., and Quincosa, A. (1979): Presencia en Cuba de tres especies de nemátodos asociadas al arroz. Ciencias de la Agricultura 4:176-177.
- Fernández, M., Razjivin, A., Ortega, J., and Quincosa, A. (1980): New Helicotylenchus (Nematoda:Hoplolaiminae) species, associated to rice crop in en Cuba. Poeyana 202:1-27.
- Razjivin, A., Fernádez, M., Ortega, J., and Quincosa A. (1981): New Hirschmanniella (Nematoda:Pratylenchinae) species, as parasites of weeds on rice plantations. Poeyana 216:1-11.
- Fernández, M., and Ortega, J. (1981): Especies de nemátodos encontradas en arroz en Cuba. Ciencias de la Agricultura 9:121.
- Fernández, M., and Ortega, J. (1981): Plantas indeseables como hospedantes de los nemátodos parásitos del arroz. Ciencias de la Agricultura 12:114-116.
- Fernández, M., and Ortega, J. (1982): Comportamiento de las poblaciones de nemátodos fitoparásitos en plátano Enano Cavendish. Ciencias de la Agricultura 13:7-17.
- Fernández, M., and Ortega, J. (1982): Nuevos hospedantes para Rotylenchulus reniformis. Ciencias de la Agricultura 13:121.
- Fernández, M., and Ortega, J. (1983): Distribución de los nemátodos fitoparásitos en zonas arroceras de Cuba. I. Provincia de Pinar del Río. Ciencias de la Agricultura 14:25-35.
- Fernández, M., and Ortega, J. (1983): Comportamiento de cultivares de soya frente a los nemátodos parásitos del arroz y del tabaco. Ciencias de la Agricultura 14:37-44.
- Fernández, M., and Ortega, J. (1983): Distribución de los nemátodos fitoparásitos en zonas arroceras de Cuba. II. Provincia de Matanzas. Ciencias de la Agricultura 16:15-22.
- Zambrana, T., Díaz, S., Fernández, M., and Díaz, H. (1984): La soya y la posibilidad de su producción en Cuba. Folleto de la Direcc. Agrícola de la Acad. de Ciencias de Cuba.
- Schliephake, E., Fernández, M., and Ortega, J. (1985): Helicotylenchus paraconcavus sp. n. (Nematoda:Hoplolaiminae), and the description of a Helicotylenchus microcephalus male. Sher, 1966. Poeyana 295:1-5.
- Fernández, M., and Ortega, J. (1985): Distribución de los nemátodos fitoparásitos en zonas arroceras de Cuba. Ciencias de la Agricultura 23:25-30.
- Fernández, M., and Ortega, J. (1986): Efectividad de dos productos químicos contra nemátodos en plátano var. Enano Cavendish. Reporte de Investigación del INIFAT 27:1-20.
- Fernández, M., Ortega, J., Heyer, W., and Cruz, B. (1986): Mejora de un método para la detección de huevos de Empoasca fabae y Agromyza sp. en plántulas de frijol. Ciencias de la Agricultura 26:41-45.
- Fernández, M., Ortega, J., and Díaz, H. (1986): Posibilidad de la sucesión de cultivos soya-tabaco respecto a los fitonemátodos. Ciencias de la Agricultura 26:23-34.
- Fernández, M., and Ortega, J. (1986): Posibilidad de la sucesión de cultivos soya-tabaco respecto a los fitonemátodos. II. Las plantas indeseables como reservorio natural de nemátodos. Ciencias de la Agricultura 27:39-42.
- Fernández, M., and Ortega, J. (1986): Consideraciones sobre la determinación de Meloidogyne incognita del suelo por medio de plantas indicadoras. Ciencias de la Agricultura 27:18-24.
- Pérez, M.A., Fernández, M., Ortega, J., and González, J. (1986): Relación de los nemátodos Meloidogyne incognita y Rotylenchulus reniformis con el hongo Rhizoctonia solani en la soya. Ciencias de la Agricultura 29:32-38.
- Fernández M., and Ortega, J. (1986): Lista de nemátodos fitoparásitos de Cuba. Editorial Científico-Técnica, La Habana, Cuba. 76pp.
- Fernández, M., Ortega, J., and Berbe, F. (1987): Posibilidad de la rotación soya-arroz respecto a los fitonemátodos. Ciencias de la Agricultura 31:14-18.
- Fernández, M. (1987): Los fitonemátodos en el cultivo del arroz, en las provincias occidentales de Cuba. Tesis para obtener el Doctorado en Ciencias Agrícolas (Ph.D.). Academia de Ciencias de Cuba, 133 pp.
- Fernández, M., Ortega, J., and Medina, P. (1989): Posibilidad de la sucesión de cultivos soya-tabaco respecto a los fitonemátodos. III. Tabaco negro. Ciencias de la Agricultura 36:20-28.
- Fernández, M., Ortega, J., Martínez, R., and Medina P. (1989): Importancia de los restos vegetales y el laboreo en el mantenimiento de poblaciones de Meloidogyne incognita en la rotación soya-tabaco negro. Ciencias de la Agricultura 36:15-19.
- Ortega, J., and Fernández, M. (1989): Parasitismo de nemátodos en plantas ornamentales. Ciencias de la Agricultura 36:152.
- Fernández, M., and Ortega, J. (1989): Consideraciones sobre la siembra de la soya en áreas de tabaco negro infestadas con el nemátodo Meloidogyne incognita. Proceedings of the IV International Conference on Soybean Research, Buenos Aires, Argentina.
- Díaz, H., Velazquez, O., González, J., Busto, I., Fernández, M., and Ortega, J. (1992): El cultivo de la soya para granos y forrajes. Centro de Información y Documentación Agropecuaria. MINAGRI, La Habana, pp:1-16.
- Fernández, M. and Ortega, J. (1995). Main nematological problems in Cuba. Proceedings of the International Congress on Tropical Nematology, Rio Quente, Goias, Brasil (June 4–9, 1995), pp:162-171.
- Fernández, M., and Ortega, J. (in press): Rotación de la soya con sorgo en una zona ganadera de Pinar del Río. Ciencias de la Agricultura.
- Delgado, E., Fernández, M., Pérez, L., and Ortega, J. (in press): Alteraciones metabólicas de las enzimas peroxidasas y polifenoloxidasas, producidas por Meloidogyne incognita en la soya. Agrotecnia de Cuba.
- Delgado, E., Fernández, M., Pérez, L., and Ortega, J. (in press): Actividad de la fenilalanina amonioliasa y su relación con la acumulación de fitoalexinas en soya infestada con Meloidogyne incognita. Agrotecnia de Cuba.
- Fernández, M. (co-author) (1996): National report on Biodiversity of the Republic of Cuba. Edited jointly by Cuban Environmental Agency and United Nations Environmental Programme (UNEP).
- Fernández, M. (1997). “Politica Ambiental Cubana. Reflexiones para un Desarrollo Sostenible”. Cuba Socialista magazine (3) 6:2-14.
- Fernández M. (Co-author). Cuban National Environmental Strategy. Ministry of Science, Technology and Environment. Cuba.27 pp.
- Cuba (1997): Law 81/97 Cuban Environmental Law. Gaceta de Cuba. (Dr. Fernandez was part of the group of authors that proposed the Law that was already passed by the Cuban National Assembly).
- Team of authors (Co-author) 1998: Environmental Strategy for Cuban Agriculture. Ministry of Agriculture. Cuba.
- Team of authors (Co-author) 1999: Draft of the National Law on Biological Diversity. Ministry of Science, Technology and Environment.
- Fernández, M. (1999): “Politica Ambiental Cubana. Reflexiones para un Desarrollo Sostenible”. In: “Cuba Verde. EN busca de un modelo para la sustentabilidad en el Siglo XXI”. Pp:370-380. Edit. José Martí, La Habana.
- Fernández, M. (2002): “Preservando la Montaña”. In “Ciencia, Innovación y Desarrollo” 7(2),:19-22.
