= Bob Henriquez =

American politician

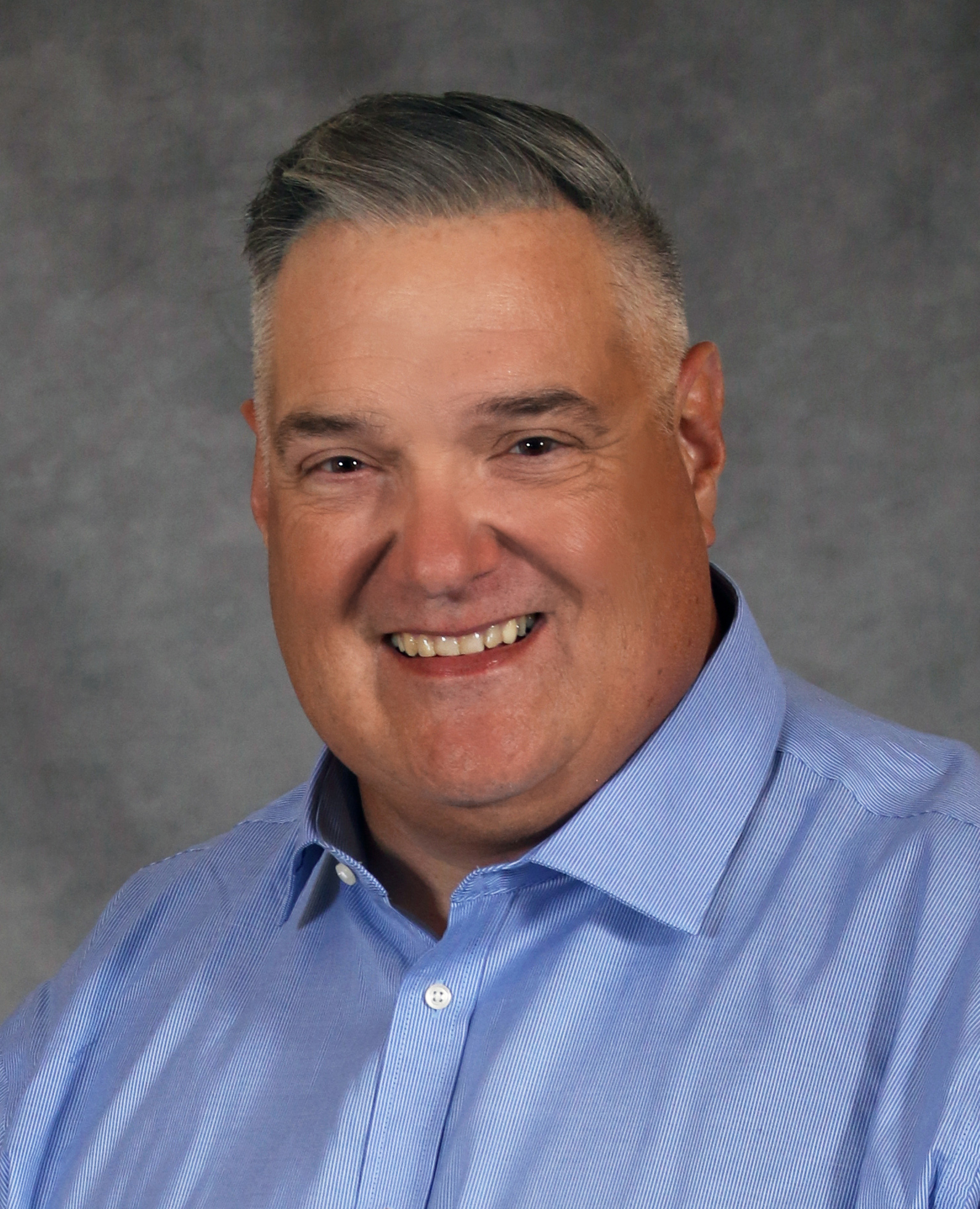

Member of the Florida House of Representatives from the 58th district
- In office November 3, 1998 – November 7, 2006
- Preceded by: Deborah Tamargo
- Succeeded by: Michael Scionti

Personal details
- Born: September 23, 1964 (age 62) Tampa, Florida, U.S.
- Party: Democratic
- Education: Princeton University (BA)

Bob Henriquez (born September 23, 1964) is a Democratic politician who currently serves as the Hillsborough County Property Appraiser since January 8, 2013, succeeding Rob Turner. Prior to his election as Property Appraiser, he served as a member of the Florida House of Representatives, representing the 58th District from 1998 to 2006.

== History ==
Henriquez was born in Tampa, Florida, and attended Princeton University, graduating with a degree in political science in 1986. After he graduated, he began working as an urban planner for the Hillsborough City-County Planning Commission and the Hillsborough County Planning and Growth Management Department, and as an assistant football coach at Tampa Catholic High School. Henriquez was the head coach at Tampa Catholic from 1990 to 1999 before he took an assistant coach position at Jefferson High School. He returned to Tampa Catholic in 2005 as head coach once again.

== Florida House of Representatives ==
In 1998, when first-term Republican State Representative Deborah Tamargo, who had first been elected in a special election the year prior, ran for re-election, Henriquez ran against her in the 58th District. During the campaign, Tamargo sent out controversial campaign literature that asserted that Henriquez could not understand problems like child abuse because he did not have children of his own, to which Henriquez said, "The Lord has not seen fit to bless our marriage with any children yet." " Ultimately, Henriquez defeated Tamargo by a wide margin, winning 56 percent of the vote to her 44 percent in one of the few bright spots for the Florida Democratic Party that year. Running for re-election in 2000, he was opposed by Eddy Calcines, a hairdresser and the Republican nominee, and he campaigned on his productivity in the legislature, noting, "Relationships are so important in Tallahassee. So much of what we do is not partisan. If you are into law-making and policy-making, there is not much room for an ideologue." Henriquez did not have a difficult time dispatching Calcines, winning re-election with 62 percent of the vote.

In 2002, Henriquez faced Hector Vila, the Republican nominee and a small business owner who ran in the Republican primary in 2000, but lost. Henriquez campaigned on continuing his emphasis on improving public education, providing assistance to seniors, protecting the environment, increasing economic prosperity, and improving public safety, and argued that his experience made him the best candidate. He defeated Vila in a landslide, winning 63 percent of the vote to Vila's 37 percent. When Henriquez ran for his final term in the legislature in 2004, he was opposed by Republican James Riis, whom he defeated in a rout with 70 percent of the vote. He was not able to seek re-election in 2006 due to term limits.

== Florida Department of Children and Families ==
On April 3, 2008, Bob Butterworth, the former Attorney General of Florida and the Secretary of the Florida Department of Children and Families, announced that Henriquez would serve as the circuit administrator for the Department in Pasco and Pinellas Counties. Butterworth praised Henriquez as "a strong local leader whose passion for serving the community made him right for the job," and Henriquez asserted that there was not any room for error on the job, noting, "You can't be 99 percent successful in this agency. You have to be 100 percent successful." Henriquez held the position from 2008 to 2011, when Rick Scott became governor.

== Hillsborough County Property Appraiser ==
In 2012, it emerged that the incumbent Hillsborough County Property Appraiser, Rob Turner, had sent "dozens of pornographic emails" to the human resources director in his office, an ex-girlfriend of his who then filed a sexual harassment claim against him. Henriquez jumped into the race and won the Democratic nomination, as did State Senator Ronda Storms, who challenged Townsend in the Republican primary. Storms defeated Turner decisively in the primary and squared off against Henriquez.

As the general election got underway, Henriquez campaigned on his ability to manage the office effectively, saying, "I'm not an appraiser by trade, but I feel like I have the requisite experience to run the office effectively and efficiently," and was able to fundraise his campaign as Storms's campaign momentum stalled. The Tampa Tribune endorsed Henriquez over Storms, praising him for his "appropriate experience and personality for a job in which objectivity and restraint are needed" and his "detailed plans for improving the appraiser's office." During the campaign, Henriquez was criticized for evaluations he received from his time at the Department of Children and Families, where his superior, though praising him for "running an efficient organization," urged him to "instill more of his own management styles and pursue goals for the circuit beyond maintenance of a once-troubled and recovering system of care." Ultimately, Henriquez defeated Storms by a wide margin, winning 52 percent of the vote to her 43 percent.

In 2016, Henriquez ran for re-election to a second term. He was challenged by Republican Todd Jones, a real estate appraiser who served as the president of the Florida Association of Property Tax Professionals. Henriquez emphasized his success in modernizing the Property Appraiser's office, "including an overhaul of the website and mobile site, while also reducing its budget." He defeated Jones by a wide margin, winning 57 percent of the vote.

Henriquez sought a third term in 2020, and faced Republican nominee D.C. Goutoufas, a businessman. Goutoufas alleged that Henriquez ran his office unfairly, accusing him of giving a favorable assessment to one of his employees and arguing that he failed to grant exemptions to businesses legally entitled to them. Henriquez rebutted the attacks, arguing that he assessed property under the law and that Goutoufas's criticism showed his inexperience and unfamiliarity with state law. The Times endorsed Henriquez over Goutoufas, noting that Henriquez "has shown throughout his long history in public service a genuine interest in listening and uncommon fairness." Henriquez defeated Goutoufas by a wide margin, winning 57-43 percent.

In 2024, Henriquez ran for re-election a fourth term. Republican John Ballance, a retired corporate executive, challenged Henriquez, arguing that he would eliminate the "bias that currently exists" in Henriquez's office. The Times again endorsed Henriquez, praising him for "run[ning] a fair and professional office" and as a "known entity and straight shooter long regarded for public and community service." Henriquez won by a narrow margin, receiving 52 percent of the vote to Ballance's 48 percent as Republican presidential nominee Donald Trump narrowly won the county.
