= Nimrod (distributed computing) =

Nimrod is a tool for the parametrization of serial programs to create and execute embarrassingly parallel programs over a computational grid. It is a co-allocating, scheduling and brokering service. Nimrod was one of the first tools to make use of heterogeneous resources in a grid for a single computation. It was also an early example of using a market economy to perform grid scheduling. This enables Nimrod to provide a guaranteed completion time despite using best-effort services.

The tool was created as a research project funded by the Distributed Systems Technology Centre. The principal investigator is Professor David Abramson of Monash University.
