= Elphin =

Elphin may refer to:

== Places ==
=== Canada ===
- Elphin, Ontario, a hamlet in Lanark Highlands, Lanark County

=== Ireland ===
- Elphin, County Roscommon, a small town
- Diocese of Elphin, a diocese
- Roman Catholic Diocese of Elphin

=== Scotland ===
- Elphin, Highland, a village in Highland council area

== People ==
- Saint Elphin, after whom is named:
  - St Elphin's Church, Warrington
  - St Elphin's School, a former boarding school in Derbyshire

== See also ==
- Elffin ap Gwyddno, a character in Welsh mythology
- Elfin (disambiguation)
