= Cooperative Research Centre =

Australian scientific research programme

Coordinates: 35°16′54.54″S 149°08′01.91″E

CRC Program logo

Cooperative Research Centres (CRCs) are an Australian Federal Government program involved in Australian scientific research. The CRC programme is administered by the Commonwealth Department of Industry, Science and Resources, which provides funding for projects through a series of funding rounds.

== History ==
The CRC came about from several internal discussions in Government and particularly from a Round Table that took place at the start of 1991 that included the Hon Bob Hawke, Hon Paul Keating. Since the commencement of the CRC Program in 1991, there have been a number of selection rounds. Selection rounds were conducted in March 1991, December 1991, December 1992, December 1994, and then at regular two-year intervals: 1996 through 2006. The very first selected CRC division was the CRC for “Waste Management and Pollution Control”, based on campus of University of New South Wales (UNSW). The very first appointment under the CRC was by Assoc. Prof. Raymond J Frost (previously Director for BHP Civil Engineering and Technology). Following the review of the Programme in 2008, the 11th and 12th selection rounds were both held in 2009.

Reviews of the CRC program are regularly undertaken. In 2012, an independent impact study found that from 1991 to 2017 CRCs generated a net economic benefit of $7.5 billion. This equates to an annual contribution of $278 million, or around 0.03 percentage points to GDP.

=== CRCA/Cooperative Research Australia ===
The Cooperative Research Centre Association (CRCA) was established on 1 December 1994 to promote the CRC program while also acting as a conduit for information sharing and learning between CRCs. It was renamed Cooperative Research Australia in 2021 and is active in representing CRCs, post-CRC entities, universities and research organisations as well as businesses involved in R&D.

== Governance and description ==
The Cooperative Research Centres program is intended to enhance Australia's industrial, commercial and economic growth through development of cooperative public-private research centres that achieve high levels of outcomes in adoption and commercialisation.

The CRC program is administered by the Commonwealth Department of Industry, Science and Resources.

== Current programs ==
As of January 2024, programs include:

- 2017 CRC for Developing Northern Australia $75M
- 2017 Food Agility CRC $50M
- 2017 CRC for High Performance Soils $39M
- 2017 iMove CRC $55M
- 2018 Fight Food Waste CRC $30M
- 2018 MinEx CRC $50M
- 2018 Digital Health CRC $55M
- 2018 Future Fuels CRC $26M
- 2018 Cyber Security CRC $50M
- 2019 SmartSat CRC, located at Lot Fourteen in Adelaide $55M
- 2019 Future Battery Industries CRC $25M
- 2019 Future Food Systems CRC $35M
- 2019 Blue Economy CRC $70M
- 2020 SmartCrete CRC $21M
- 2020 Building 4.0 CRC $28M
- 2020 Future Energy Exports CRC $40M
- 2020 CRC for Transformations in Mining Economies $29
- 2020 RACE for 2030 CRC $68M
- 2021 Marine Bioproducts CRC $59M
- 2021 Heavy Industry Low-carbon Transition Cooperative Research Centre (HILT CRC) $39M
- 2021 Digital Finance CRC $60M
- 2022 Sovereign Manufacturing Automation for Composites (SoMAC) CRC, renamed Advanced Composites Manufacturing (ACM) CRC in late-2023 $70M
- 2022 CRC Solving Antimicrobial Resistance in Agribusiness, Food and Environments (SAAFE) $34M
- 2022 One Basin CRC $50M

== Past programs ==
=== SERC ===
The Cooperative Research Centre (CRC) for Space Environment Management was administered by the Space Environment Research Centre (SERC). Based on Mount Stromlo, SERC operated from 2014 to 2021 and conducted research into practical global efforts for space debris management, mitigation and removal. SERC Participants included EOS Space Systems, Lockheed Martin, Optus Satellite, Australian National University, RMIT University and NICT (Japan).

=== Bushfire CRC ===
The Bushfire Cooperative Research Centre was an Australian-based organisation which conducted research into the social, environmental, and economic impact of bushfires. Although the CRC has completed operations, a legacy of a decade of research content is still online and accessible. Funded originally by a grant from the Australian government's Cooperative Research Centre in 2003, the Bushfire CRC was funded to 2014 to address key issues raised by recent major fires. The Bushfire CRC was made up of all the fire and land management agencies in Australia and New Zealand, CSIRO, the Bureau of Meteorology, the Attorney General's Department and several other fire related organisations. A small executive office was maintained in East Melbourne. The organisation participated in the Cooperative Research Centres Association (CRCA). The work of Bushfire research was carried forward within the expanded research portfolio of the Bushfire and Natural Hazards CRC, from 2013 to 2021, and now with Natural Hazards Research Australia (NHRA). The NHRA was funded for 10 years by the Australian Government on 1 July 2021 as a collaborative research organisation, to address the major challenges arising from natural hazards, including bushfires, floods, cyclones, heatwaves, storms and other hazards. The aim is to deliver usable research and knowledge that creates safer and more resilient communities.

=== CSSIP ===
The Cooperative Research Centre for Sensor Signal and Information Processing (or CSSIP) was an organisation established under the Cooperative Research Centres program. It operated from 1992 to 2006, performing research, development, and education within several Information and Communications Technology areas: CSSIP's education arm was assigned to NICTA in mid-2005.

=== CRC Spatial information ===
The CRC for Spatial Information (CRCSI) was a research organisation funded by Australia's Cooperative Research Centre Programme (CRC) and by participant contributions. The CRCSI was founded in 2003 with the successful re-bid announced in August 2009. The programme ended in June 2018. The CRCSI conducted research and development projects that involved collaboration between government, corporate, and academic resources. The CRCSI ensured Australia and New Zealand remained relevant in a spatially-connected world. The CRCSI was responsible for innovative research; the application and commercialisation of spatial information technologies by building collaborative partnerships. A study commissioned by the CRCSI and ANZLIC in 2008 found that the spatial information industry contributed between $6.4 and $12.6 billion to Australia's GDP in 2006–2007 alone. CRCSI has offices in Melbourne, Canberra, Sydney, Brisbane, Perth and Wellington in New Zealand. The CRCSI research delved into key industry sectors, including: agriculture, natural resources and climate change; defence; built environment; and health through the delivery of spatial information across positioning, rapid spatial analytics and spatial infrastructures.

=== CRC Reef ===
The Cooperative Research Centre for the Great Barrier Reef World Heritage Area operated from 1997 to 2006.

=== DSTC ===
The Cooperative Research Centre for Distributed Systems Technology and the Cooperative Research Centre for Enterprise Distributed Systems were two successive CRC programs operated by the Distributed Systems Technology Centre. Its website was archived following its closure in June 2006.

=== CRC for Advanced Composite Structures ===
The Cooperative Research Centre for Advanced Composite Structures Limited (CRC-ACS) operated from 1996 to 2015. In 2008 a wholly owned subsidiary, Advanced Composite Structures Australia (ACS-A), was created to manage its rapidly growing commercial activities. When CRC-ACS concluded its mission, the ownership was passed to the then directors and employees of ACS-A who were charged with leading the company into a fully commercial future.

=== Seafood CRC ===
The Australian Seafood Cooperative Research Centre (Seafood CRC) received funding from the Commonwealth Government in the tenth round of CRC funding and was established in 2007 and operated until 2014. The CRC's areas of research expertise include benchmarking, product innovation, genetics, consumption drivers and barriers, processing, supply chain management technologies, technical market access, health claims and nutritional composition. The Seafood CRC resulted in the establishment of the world's first year-round aquaculture of Yellowtail Kingfish; highly prized for sushi and sashimi. The CRC research had a direct impact on achieving increased fish survival through more effective hatchery management, new information on fish growth and health, superior genetic management and cost-effective dietary formulations.

== Archives ==
A number of websites of the past CRCs are archived in perpetuity on the National Library of Australia's Trove online library database aggregator.

- CRC for Alloy and Solidification Technology (1993–1999)
  - CRC for Cast Metals Manufacturing (1999 – 2005)
    - CAST CRC (2005–2012)
- CRC for Mining Technology and Equipment (1991 – 2003)
  - CRC Mining (2003–2017) which became Mining3
- CRC for Intelligent Manufacturing Systems and Technologies (IMST) 1993–2006
- Advanced Manufacturing CRC (AMCRC) (2008 to 2015)
- Innovative Manufacturing CRC (IMCRC) (2016 to 2022)

== See also ==
- CSIRO – Commonwealth Scientific and Industrial Research Organisation
- Lowitja Institute
