= Enes Ibrahim =

Macedonian politician

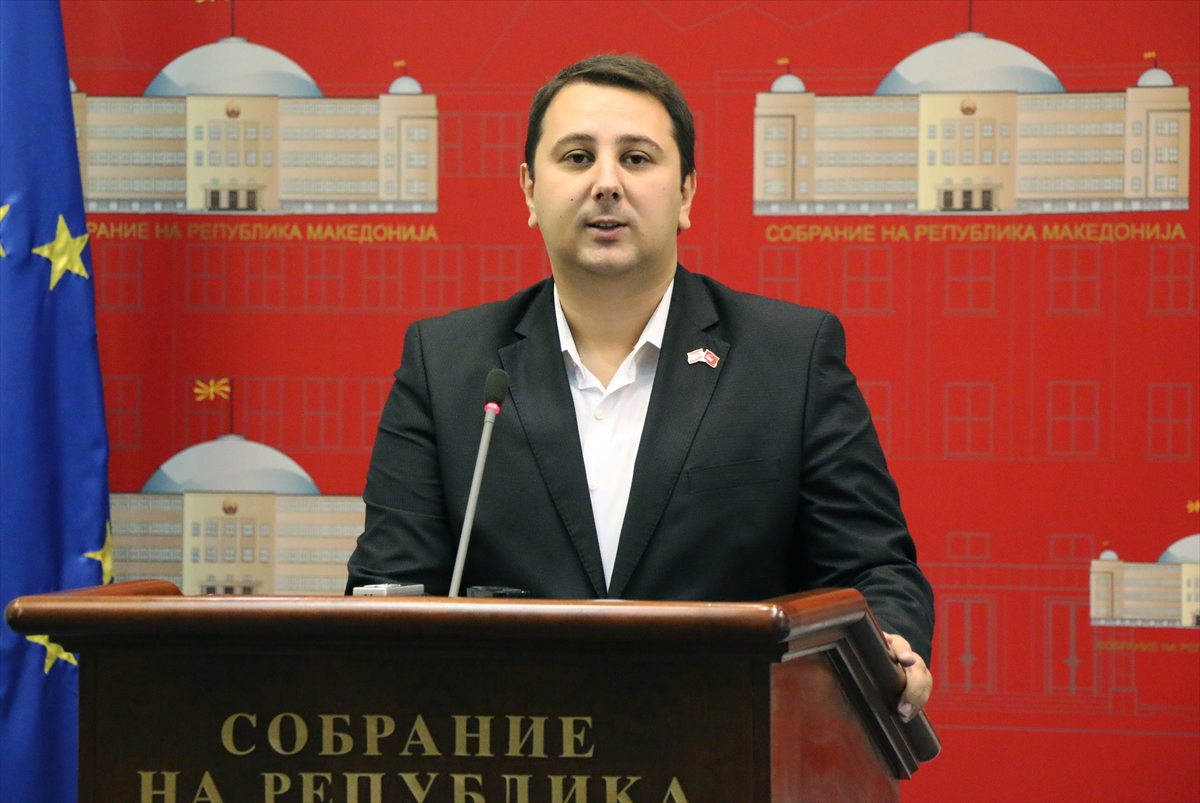
- Born: August 8, 1984 (age 41); Skopje, SR Macedonia, SFR Yugoslavia
- Citizenship: Macedonian
- Education: Yahya Kemal College
- Alma mater: Ss. Cyril and Methodius University of Skopje
- Occupation: Member of the Assembly of North Macedonia
- Political party: Macedonia Turkish Movement Party

Enes Ibrahim (Macedonian: Енес Ибрахим (born 8 August 1984) is a member of the Assembly of North Macedonia, a Turkish political figure.

== Early years and college ==
Enes Ibrahim was born on 8 August 1984 in Skopje, the capital of the current North Macedonia into a family with Turkish origins. After studying at the Tafayyuz secondary school, he continued his education at Yahya Kemal College.

Enes Ibrahim was admitted to Ss. Cyril and Methodius University of Skopje, the Faculty of Philology. He was socially active during his years of university and tried to bring the problems and difficulties of the Turkish community living in North Macedonia to the agenda of the country.

== Career ==
In 2008, Enes Ibrahim founded the Ufug organization, and in 2012, he was elected the chairman of the same organization. At the same time, he worked as the editor-in-chief of the organization's official news agency during his leadership.

Enes Ibrahim has organized dozens of events, conferences, and platforms on the problems of ethnic minorities living in North Macedonia throughout the country, as well as abroad. In 2012, he joined the Turkish Movement Party. He was elected the Secretary General of the party in 2013 and the chairman of the party in 2018.

He won the 2014 Macedonian parliamentary election. He is the only Turkish and Muslim MP in the Assembly of North Macedonia.

== See also ==
- Macedonian general election, 2014
- Assembly of North Macedonia
