= Frank Diaz-Silveira =

American lawyer (born 1936)

- Born: 1936 (age 89–90); Havana, Cuba

Francisco Díaz-Silveira Tamargo (born 13 August 1936), known as Frank Diaz-Silveira, is a Cuban-American lawyer and former Florida State Representative, known as an anti-Castro Cuban militant. He was also an attorney in Florida and a former candidate for the Florida Senate, Mayor of Miami, Florida House of Representatives and Miami City Commission.

== Family ==
Diaz-Silveira is the son of the imminent Abogado-Notario (attorney-notary) Francisco Diaz-Silveira Lopez and Ana Gloria Tamargo-Sanchez (sister of Margarita Tamargo-Sanchez). He is also the grandson of Francisco Diaz-Silveira and the second-cousin of prominent builder, Alonso J. del Portillo-Tamargo and the Cuban diplomat Modesto F. Fernandez Diaz-Silveira. Diaz-Silveira was married to Adela Jaramillo-Mora and they had four children, Adela Jane (b. 1962), Frank (b. 1963), Alberto (b. 1965), and Eddy (b. 1969). He later married in 1986 Armantina Forns-Cuervo, but that marriage also ended in divorce in 1991. His son Eddy had two children, Krysten (b. 1997) and Gabriela (b. 2000).

== Education ==
He received his law degree at the University of Havana in 1957 and then graduated in 1975 from the American Law Program at the University of Miami.

== Anti-Castro activities ==
On November 16, 1960, Diaz-Silveira led a group of young Cubans to attack the Cuban Embassy in Lima, Peru; taking documents of the archives of the diplomatic seat. On August 9, 1961, he was ejected from the Inter-American Economic and Social Conference for causing a fist fight and for interrupting a two-hour speech being given by Ernesto Guevara.

== Political races ==
He first ran for office in 1975 for a seat on the Miami City Commission, he lost. In 1976, he ran a campaign for the Florida House of Representatives, which he lost. On November 2, 1982, Diaz-Silveira received 20,077 votes out of 49,041 votes in the Florida Senate race of District 34, running against the incumbent Joe Gersten. In 1983, he unsuccessfully ran for mayor of the City of Miami.
