= Music in Bashkortostan =

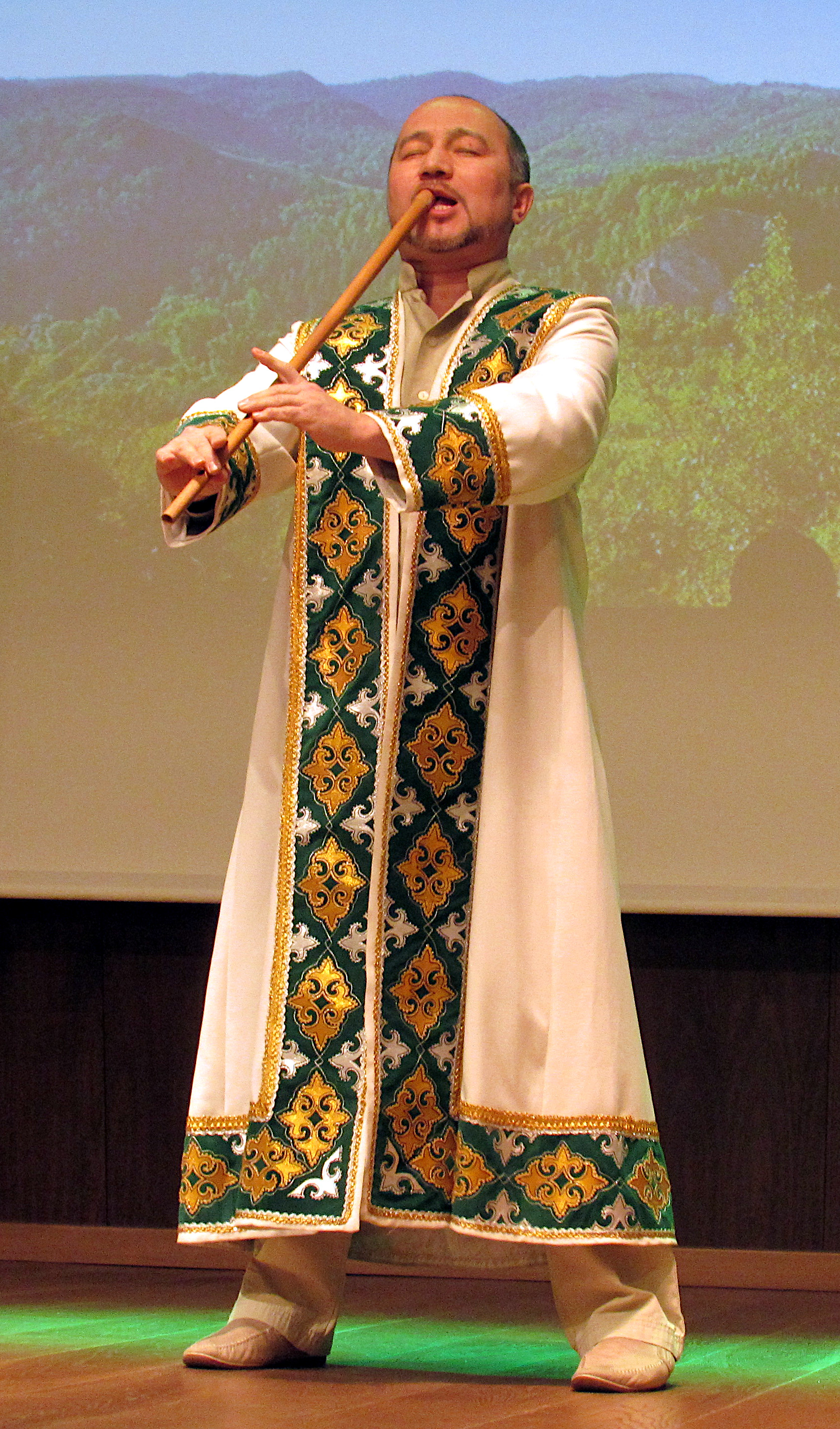
Kurai

Music in Bashkortostan is the music of the peoples who live in Bashkortostan (Bashkirs, Russians, Tatars, Chuvashs, Mari, Udmurts, Ukrainians and others).

== History ==
The first major study of the music of Bashkortostan appeared in 1897, when ethnographer Rybakov S.G. wrote Music and Songs of the Ural's Muslims and Studies of Their Way of Life. Later, Lebedinskiy L.N. collected numerous folk songs in Bashkortostan beginning in 1930. The 1968 foundation of the Ufa State Institute of Arts sponsored research in the field.

The quray (end-blown flute) is the most important instrument in the Bashkir ensemble; it is made from a special reed found only in the Ural Mountains. It is used in both traditional and modern popular music. Zahir Bayiq played some Enigma and own melodies.

The National Symphonic Orchestra of the Bashkortostan Republic was founded in 1992 under the leadership of Tahir Kamalov. It emerged as one of the major symphonies in late 20th century Russia.

G. Gaskarav, the first artistic leader of folk theatrical choreography of the Bashkir, founded a professional folk dance ensemble in 1939. This band has travelled across much of the world.

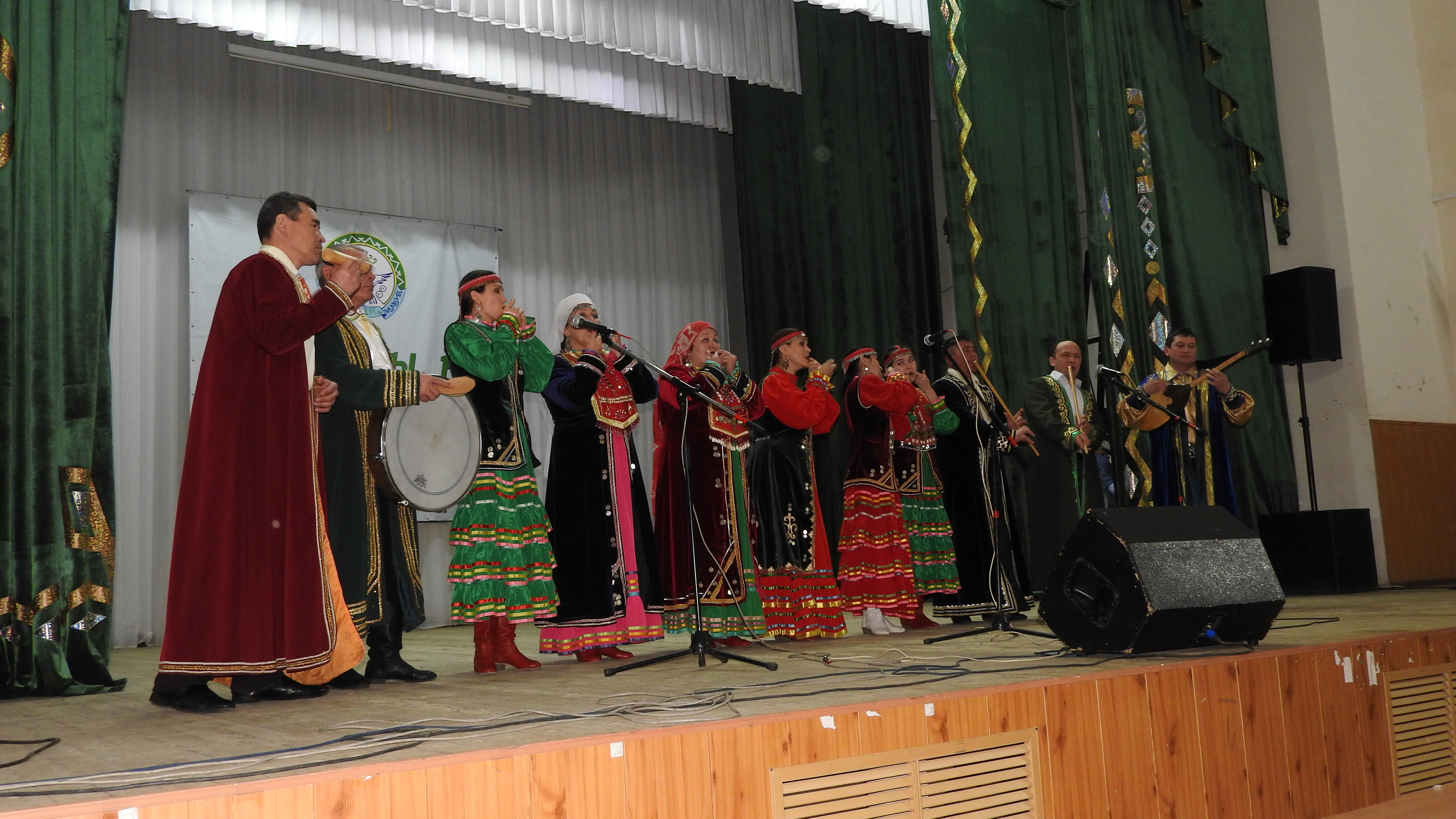
Folk music performance

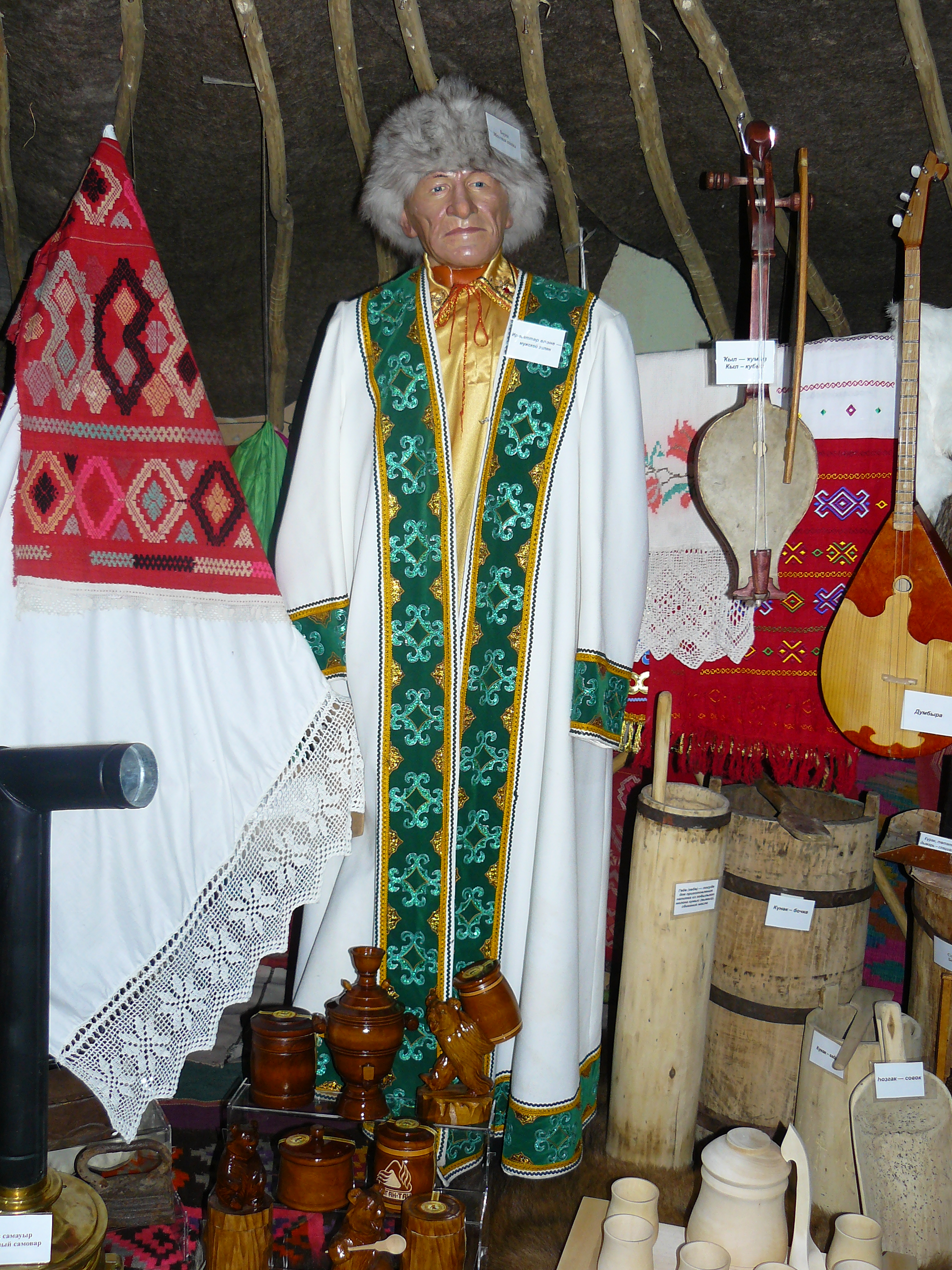
Traditional Bashkir musical instruments in a museum

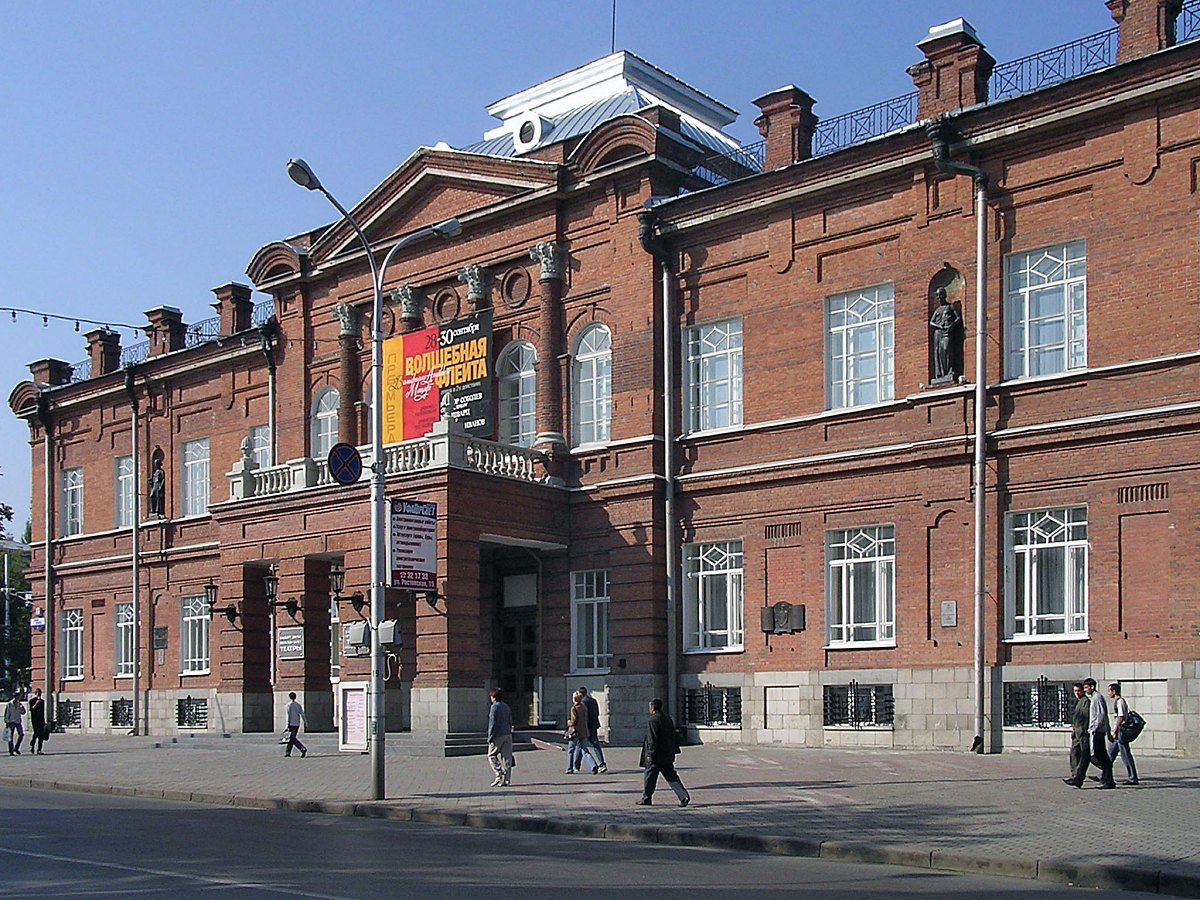
Bashkir State Opera and Ballet Theater

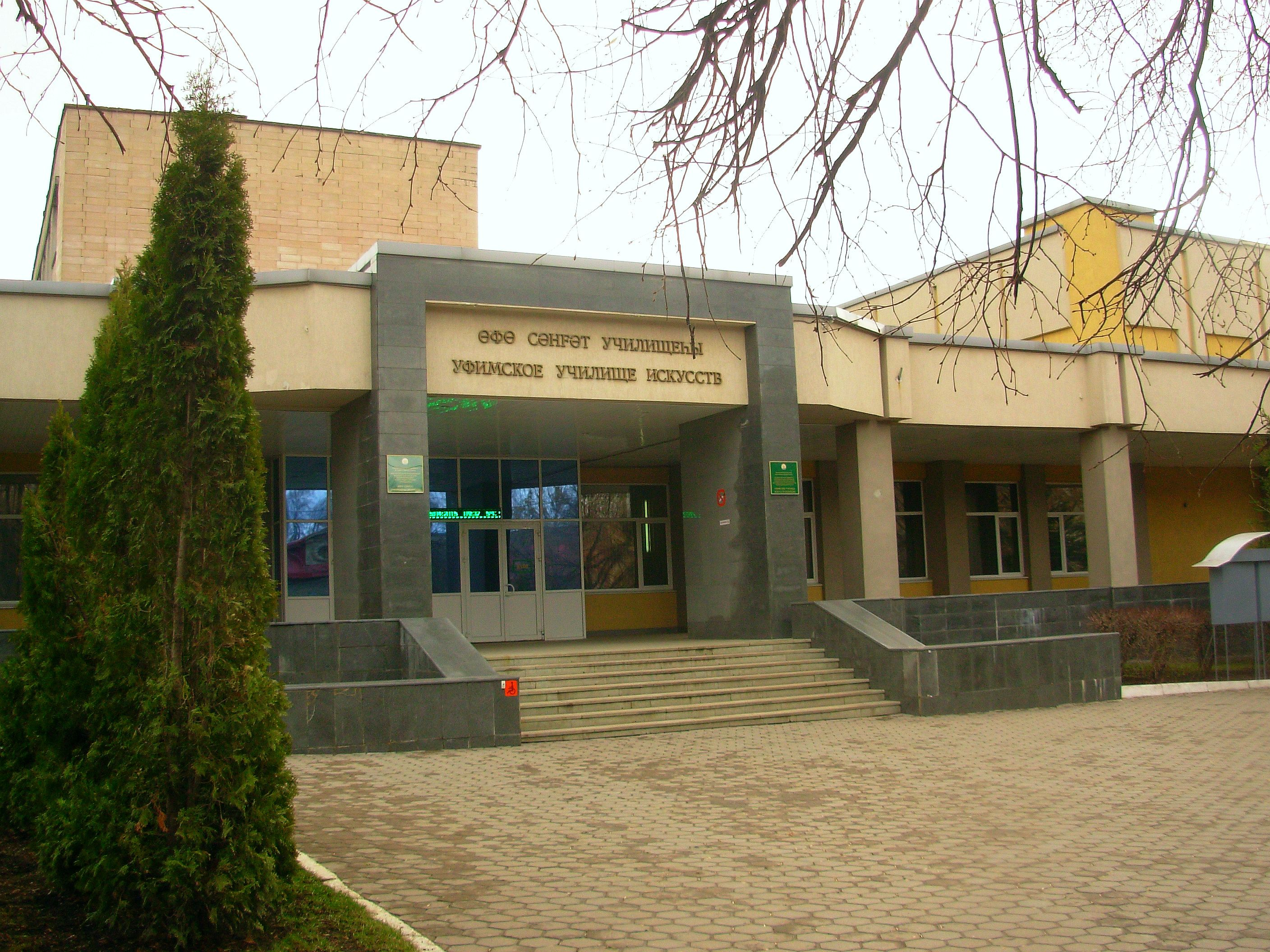
Ufa College of Arts

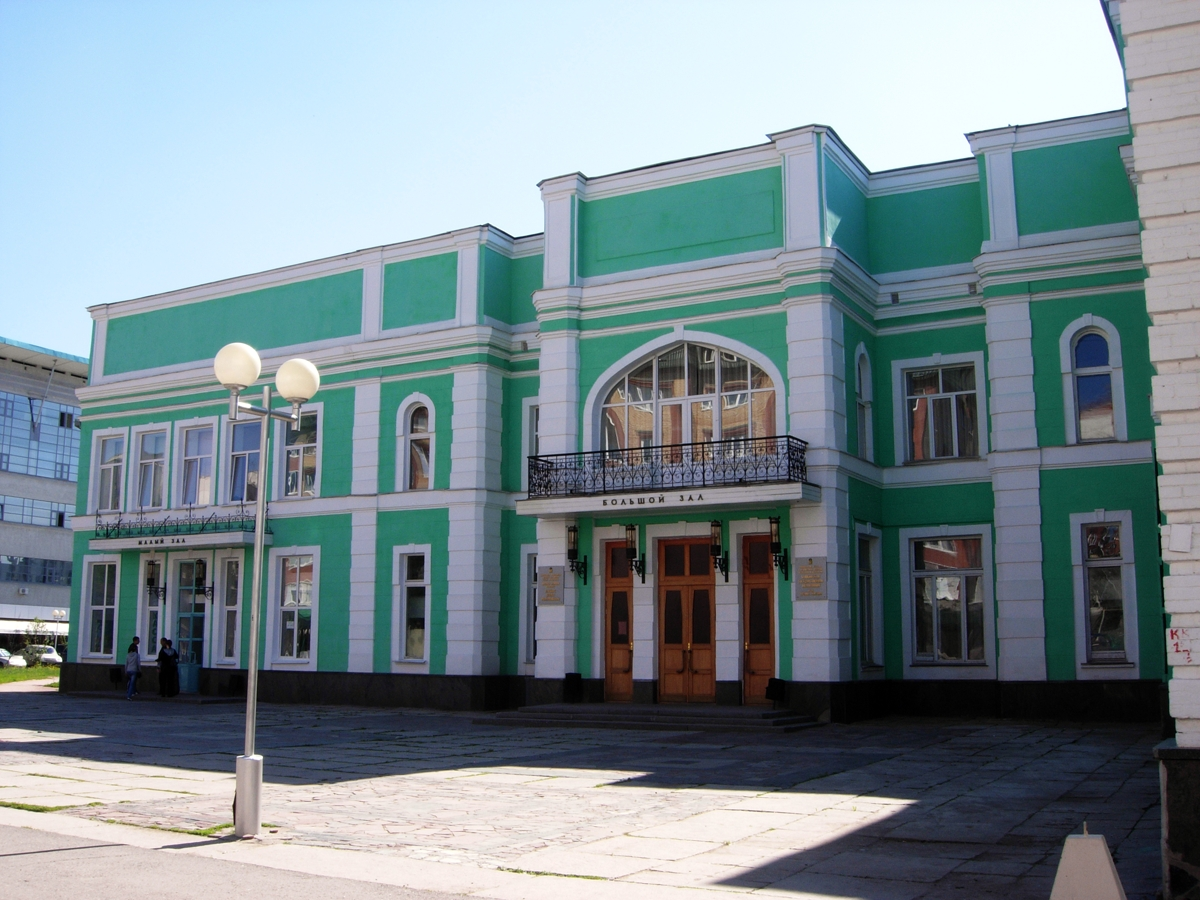
Baskhir State Philharmonic

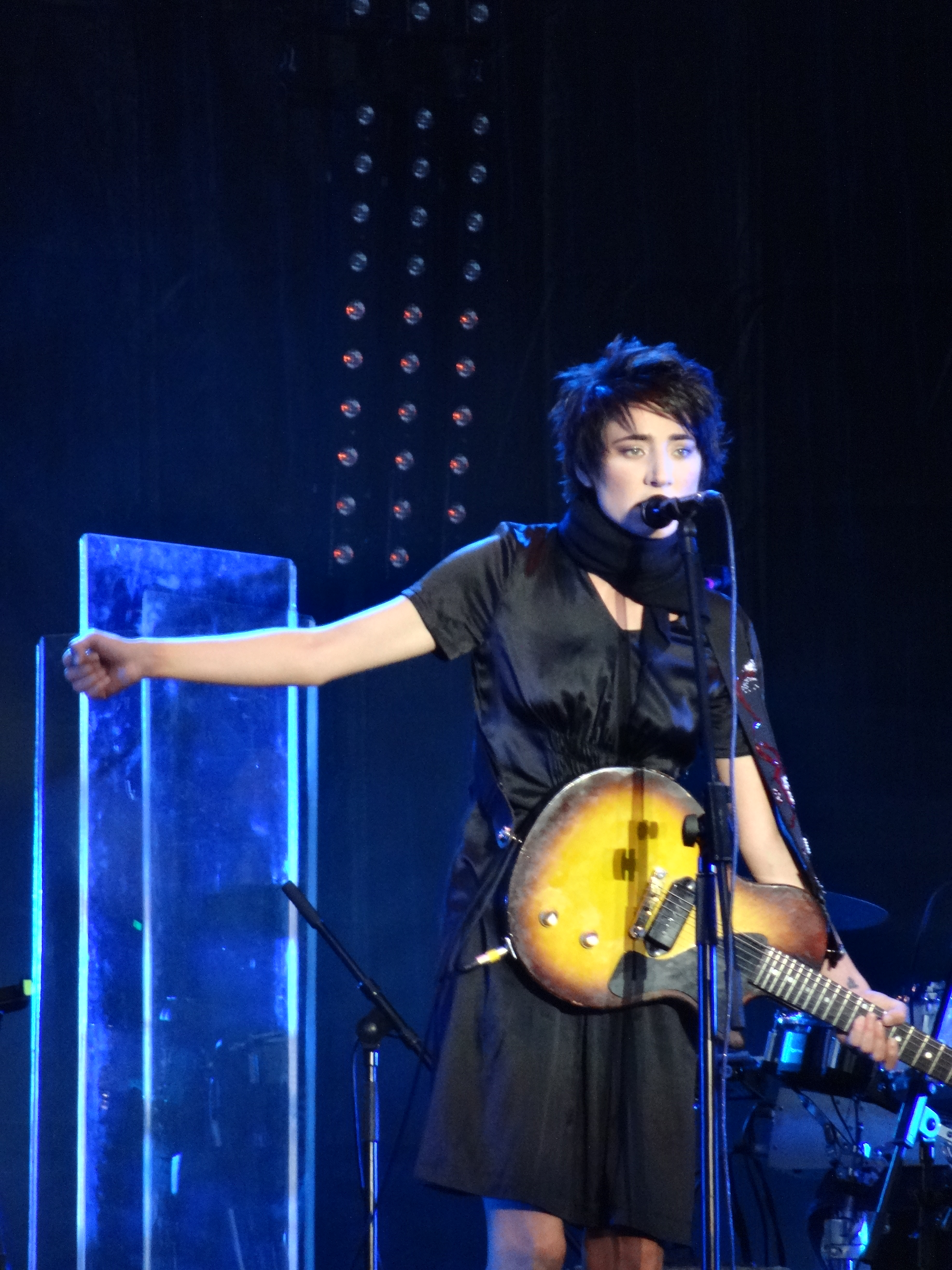
Zemfira, Bashkortostan-born Russian rock star

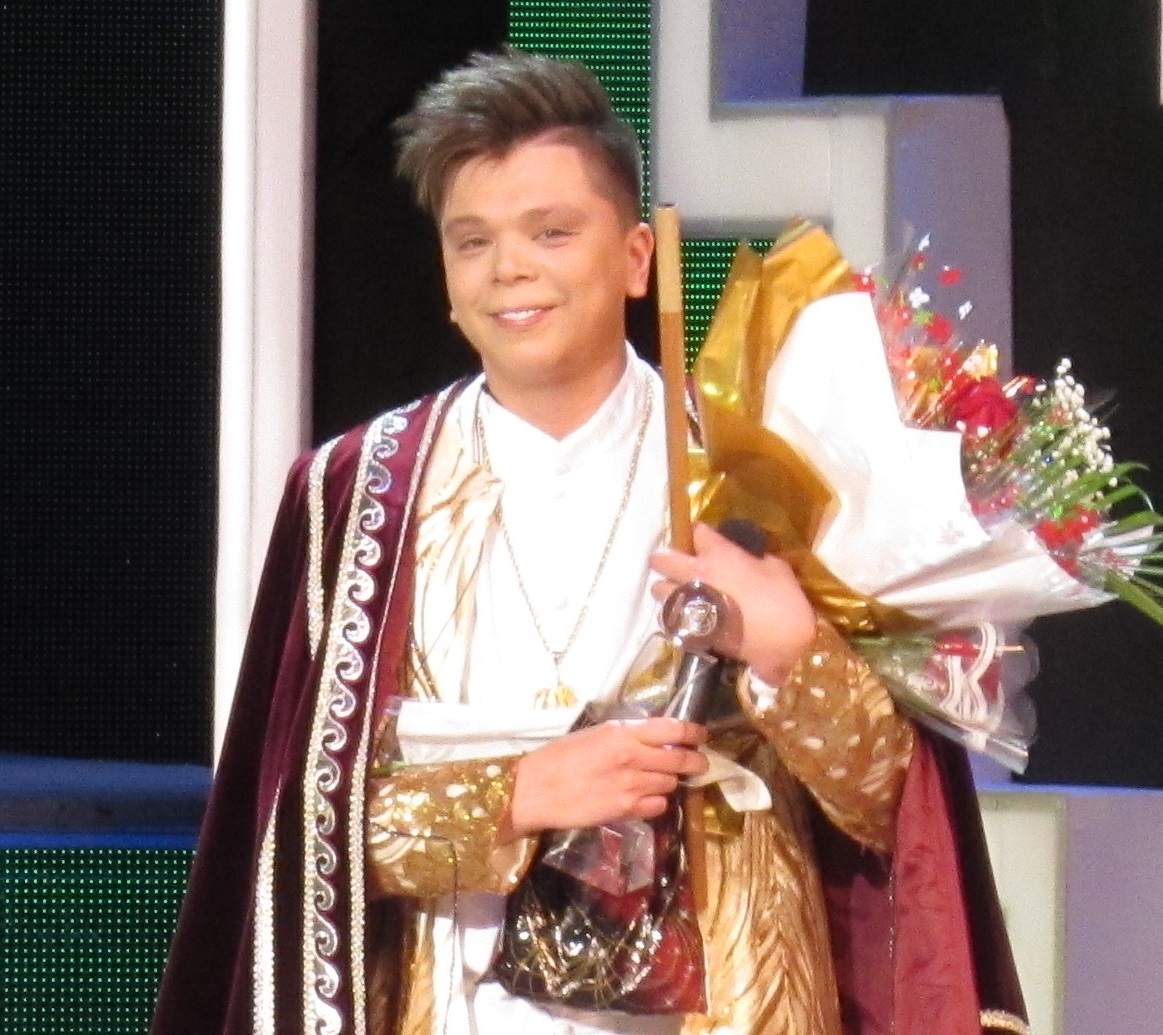
Elvin Grey, Bashkir pop star

== Musical education ==
- Ufa State Institute (Academy) of Arts named Zagir Ismagilov (founded in 1968) - faculties of music, Bashkir music, theater, visual arts
- Bashkir State Pedagogical University named after M. Akmulla, Institute of Pedagogy (specialty music)
- Ufa College of Arts (founded in 1921)
- Salawat College of Music (founded in 1961)
- Music College of the city of Oktyabrsky (founded in 1969)
- Uchaly College of Arts and Culture named after Salawat Nizametdinov (founded in 1972)
- Sibay College of the Arts (founded in 1997)
- Bashkir Republican College of Culture and Art (Sterlitamak) (founded in 1933)
- Republican gymnasium named after G. Almukhametov (secondary school and music school)
- Art schools for children in cities and regions of the republic

== Literature ==
- Bashkir Encyclopedia . Гл. ред. М. А. Ильгамов. — Уфа: Башкирская энциклопедия.
- Т. 1. А-Б. 2005. — 624 с. — ISBN 5-88185-053-X
- Т. 2. В-Ж. 2006. — 624 с. — ISBN 5-88185-062-9
- Т. 3. З-К. 2007. — 672 с. — ISBN 978-5-88185-064-7
- Т. 4. Л-О. 2008. — 672 с. — ISBN 978-5-88185-068-5
- Р.Шакур. Собиратель и исследователь (К 110-летию Л.Н.Лебединского). Журнал «Ватандаш», No.12, 2014
- Атанова Л.П. Собиратели и исследователи башкирского музыкального фольклора. Уфа, 1992
