= Elven =

Elven may refer to:

- The adjectival form of Elf, in particular:
  - Elven (comics), a 1994 four issue comic book written by Len Strazewski and drawn by Aaron Lopresti
  - Elven Legacy, a 2009 PC video game
  - Elven-languages created by J. R. R. Tolkien
- An alternate spelling of Elwen, derived therefrom:
  - Elven, Morbihan, a town in Morbihan, France

== See also ==
- Elvan (disambiguation)
- Elvin (disambiguation)
- Elfin (disambiguation)
- Eleven (disambiguation)
