= Aminta Granera =

Aminta Granera Sacasa
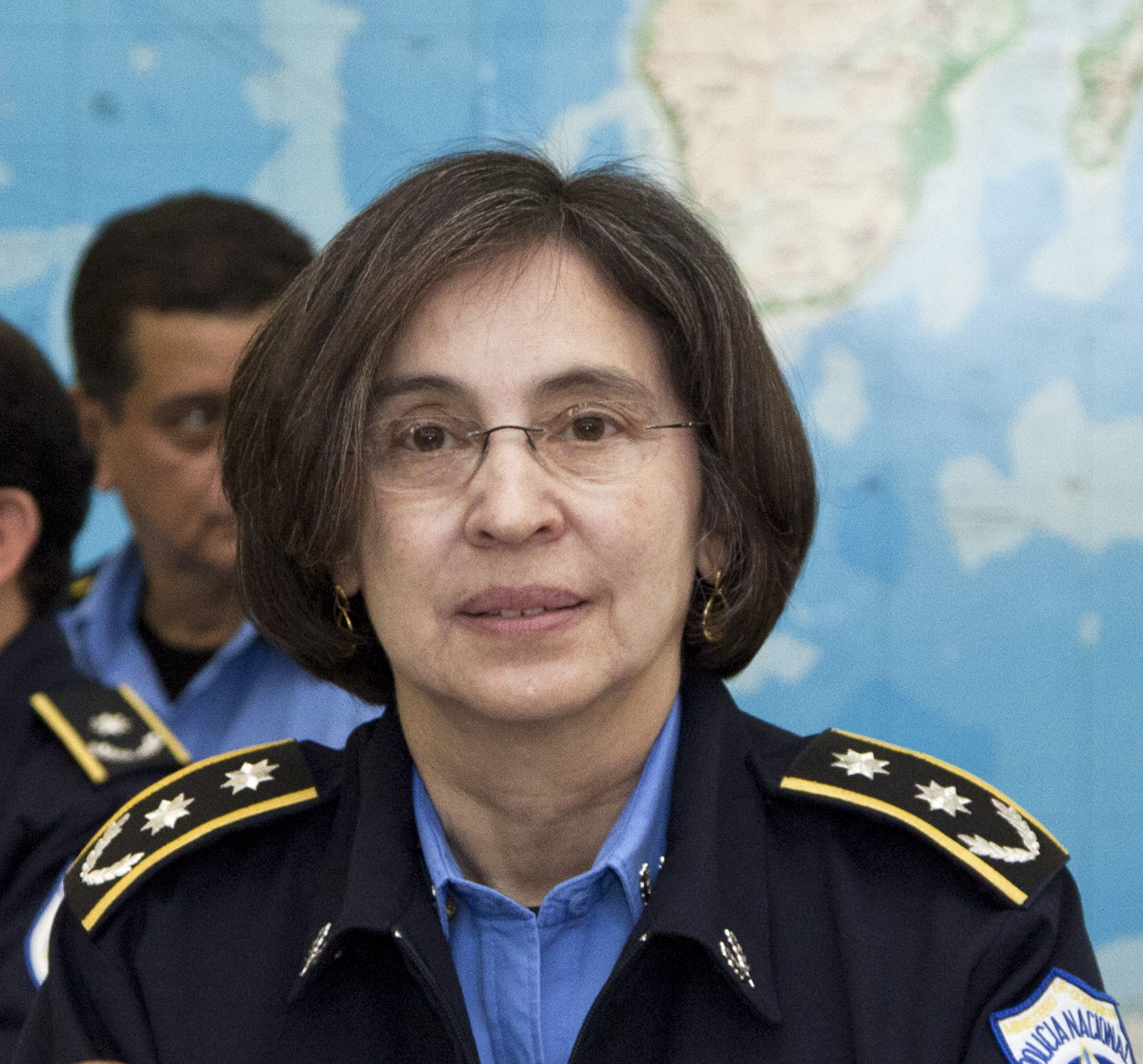
- Aminta Granera in 2013

Director General of the National Police of Nicaragua
- In office September 5, 2006 – April 27, 2018
- Preceded by: Edwin Cordero Ardila
- Succeeded by: Francisco Javier Díaz Madriz
- Appointed by: Enrique Bolaños
- Appointed by: Daniel Ortega

Personal details
- Born: September 18, 1952 (age 72); León, Nicaragua

Aminta Granera Sacasa (born 18 September 1952) is a former Sandinista revolutionary and the former Director General of the National Police of Nicaragua. She was the chief of the National Police from September 5, 2006, until April 27, 2018.

== Early life ==
Aminta Granera Sacasa was born 18 September 1952 in León, Nicaragua. After studies at Georgetown University in the United States, Granera decided to become a nun and began her novitiate with the Sisters of the Assumption in Guatemala City.

== Career ==
Grenera left her religious training in 1976 to join the Sandinista uprising against dictator Anastasio Somoza. As a revolutionary, she was part of a Christian urban insurrection group. After the successful overthrow of Somoza in 1979, she joined the Ministry of the Interior (Mint) under Sandinista National Liberation Front (FSLN) comandante Tomás Borge. When the Sandinista administration ended in 1990, she joined the new National Police, which aimed to professionalize the police force, removing it from partisan politics. She helped to set up special units to combat violence against women and crime against children. She also worked to fight police corruption.

In 2006, she was appointed as the national chief of police by conservative president Enrique Bolaños, starting her tenure by replacing several high-ranking police officers. She enjoyed broad national popularity, with approval ratings above 80% (83% in 2013). In 2011, she was appointed to a second term by president Daniel Ortega. During her tenure, she worked to increase the number of women serving in the police force, with the goal of reaching 50 percent. However, the police under her tenure also drew allegations of human rights violations and repression of Ortega's critics.

Grenera resigned as chief of National Police on April 28, 2018, in the face of mass protests across Nicaragua, dozens of deaths and widespread criticism of the police response.

== Personal life ==
Granera is married to economist Oswaldo Gutiérrez, with whom she has three children. The first was born during the revolutionary war, and after leaving the child with her mother, she returned to the front. She is also the grandmother of Ariel Barrios.
