= Deborah Tamargo =

American politician

Member of the Florida House of Representatives from the 58th district
- In office October 21, 1997 – November 3, 1998
- Preceded by: Elvin Martinez
- Succeeded by: Bob Henriquez

Personal details
- Born: March 18, 1948 (age 78)
- Party: Republican
- Education: University of South Florida (B.A.)
- Occupation: Real estate broker, horse breeder

Deborah Tamargo (born March 18, 1948) is a Republican politician from Florida who served as a member of the Florida House of Representatives from the 58th district from 1997 to 1998.

== Early career ==
Tamargo was born in 1948, and attended the University of South Florida, graduating in 1970. Tamargo worked as a social worker for Hillsborough County Health and Human Services from 1971 to 1978, and as a real estate agent and horse breeder.

In 1996, Tamargo ran for the Hillsborough County Commission from District 6 in 1996. In the Republican primary, she faced retired contractor John Thibodeau, former Tampa City Councilman Larry Smith, former Tampa Bay Buccaneers cheerleader Jennifer Bartlett, and financial planner Terry Morehouse. Tamargo placed third in the primary, winning 16 percent of the vote to Thibodeau's 30 percent, Smith's 23 percent, Bartlett's 16, percent, and Morehouse's 14 percent.

== Florida House of Representatives ==
In 1997, Governor Lawton Chiles appointed Democratic State Representative Elvin Martinez, who represented a West Tampa-based district, to the Hillsborough County Court. Chiles called a special election for October 21, 1997, and Tamargo announced that she would run.

Tamargo faced community activist Emilio Vazquez and jewelry store owner Noemi Alfonso Burruezo in the Republican primary. Tamargo ultimately placed first, winning 49 percent of the vote to Vazquez's 46 percent, but did not win a majority of the vote, and a runoff election took place. Tamargo narrowly defeated Vazquez in the runoff, 52–48 percent.

She advanced to the general election, where she faced Democratic nominee Kathy Martinez, an attorney. Even though the district reliably voted for Democratic candidates, the race attracted statewide attention, with prominent politicians of both parties campaigning for Martinez and Tamargo. Tamargo and the Republican Party of Florida outspent Martinez. Tamargo defeated Martinez by a wide margin, winning 58 percent of the vote to her 42 percent,

Tamargo ran for re-election in 1998, and faced high school football coach Bob Henriquez, the Democratic nominee, in the general election. During the general election, Tamargo sent out a mailing that accused Henriquez of not being able to understand problems like child abuse because he did not have children, with the flier stating: "Maybe if Bob Henriquez had children he'd think differently." Henriquez replied, "The Lord has not seen fit to bless our marriage with any children yet," to which Tamargo said, "It's not my fault they can't have kids." Henriquez defeated Tamargo by a wide margin, receiving 56 percent of the vote to her 44 percent.

== Post-legislative career ==
Several months after leaving office, Tamargo attended a reunion at the State House, and sat in the seat of Republican State Representative Harry Goode. While sitting, she cast a vote on a pending piece of legislation while Goode was taking a smoking break.

In 2014, Tamargo was elected Chair of the Hillsborough County Republican Party, and served until 2018.
