= Bushfire and Natural Hazards CRC =

Natural disaster research organisation in Oceania (2013–2021)

Bushfire and Natural Hazards CRC Limited

Statutory Corporation overview
- Formed: May 13, 2013
- Jurisdiction: Australia
- Headquarters: 340 Albert Street, East Melbourne VIC 3002; 37.8095817°S 144.9775391°E
- Annual budget: AUD$47 million over eight years
- Parent department: Department of Industry and Science
- Website: bnhcrc.com.au

The Bushfire and Natural Hazards Cooperative Research Centre, commonly abbreviated to Bushfire and Natural Hazards CRC, was a research institute that from 2013 to 2021 drew together all of Australia and New Zealand's fire and emergency service authorities, land management agencies, as well as non-government organisations and leading experts across a range of scientific fields to explore the causes, consequences and mitigation of natural disasters.

The CRC had special focus on the human, infrastructure, and governance aspects of natural hazards including: earthquake, tsunami, flood, cyclone, and bushfire.

== History ==
The CRC was launched at Parliament House Canberra by the Minister for Justice, the Hon Michael Keenan, MP, on 10 December 2013. The Minister said the Bushfire and Natural Hazards CRC acknowledged the ongoing impacts of natural hazards upon communities, emergency service providers, governments, agriculture and other industries.

In announcing the Australian Government commitment to the CRC in February 2013, then Prime Minister Julia Gillard said the new centre would build on the work of the Bushfire CRC and expand the research into natural hazards.

The Bush fire and Natural Hazards CRC, which built on the prior work of the Bushfire CRC that ran from 2003 to 2014, transitioned into Natural Hazards Research Australia on 1 July 2021.

== Governance ==
The Bushfire and Natural Hazards CRC was an incorporated not-for-profit public company limited by guarantee. It was managed through a small central office co-located with the Australasian Fire and Emergency Service Authorities Council in East Melbourne, with staff also based in Adelaide, Darwin and Canberra. It had a skills-based Board of Directors elected by its Members. The Board was chaired by an independent Director.

The Bushfire and Natural Hazards CRC was funded for eight years with $47 million from the Australian Government's Cooperative Research Centre, CRC program. The remainder funds—cash and in-kind—came from partner agencies, government organisations and research institutions from all states and territories and New Zealand.
