= National Police of Nicaragua =

National Police of Nicaragua Policía Nacional Nicaragüense
- Official seal of La Policía Nacional Nicaragüense
- Motto: Honor, Seguridad, Servicio; Honor, Security, Service

Agency overview
- Formed: August 22, 1979
- Employees: 16,000

Jurisdictional structure
- National agency (Operations jurisdiction): Nicaragua
- Operations jurisdiction: Nicaragua
- Legal jurisdiction: As per operations jurisdiction
- General nature: Civilian police

Operational structure
- Headquarters: Managua, Nicaragua
- Agency executive: Francisco Javier Díaz Madriz, Director General of the National Police of Nicaragua

Website
- www.policia.gob.ni

The National Police of Nicaragua (Spanish: Policía Nacional Nicaragüense) is the national police of Nicaragua. The force is in charge of regular police functions and, at times, works in conjunction with the Nicaraguan Armed Forces, making it an indirect and rather subtle version of a gendarmerie. However, the Nicaraguan National Police work separately and have a different established set of norms than the nation's military.

== History ==
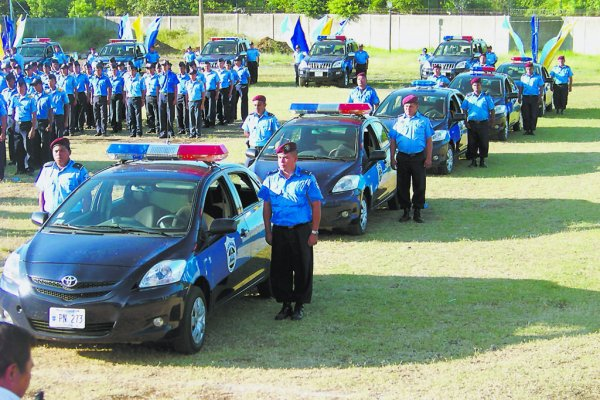
National Police officers with police cars

The National Police of Nicaragua came from the popular breast. Its training began in July 1979 after the overthrow of the National Guard, the armed wing of the Somoza dictatorship. Junta of National Reconstruction decreed on 22 August of that year, the Fundamental Statute of the Republic of Nicaragua in its Art. 23 declares dissolved the National Guard, the Office of Homeland Security and Military Intelligence Service and the laws of the country.

The institution was officially born on September 5 of that year under the name of the Sandinista Police, however, was up in 1980 with the Decree 559 establishing the "Act Jurisdictional Functions of the Sandinista police."

Initially, it had the support of advisers who trained the Panamanian first generation in the Police Academy called initially Basic Military Training School, now Police Academy "Walter Mendoza Martinez" Institute for Advanced Studies.

From 1982 to 1988 was a period marked by the primacy of military defense because of armed conflict existed. Forces were established operational / administrative support to the Interior Ministry troops.

Between 1989 and 1992 it underwent a period of transition to peace, changing the uniform and assumed the name of National Police. Executive Order 45-92 defined the function, organization and police career. In 1992, Act 144, Act of the National Police functions on Legal Aid, define new functions to the institution.

The period 1993-1997 was marked by the strengthening of institutions, from the constitutional reforms of 1995 that allowed the enactment of Law 228, Law of the National Police, issued on July 31, 1996 and its regulations by Decree Presidential Instruction No. 26-96, issued on October 25 of that year.

With Law 228 is clearly defined vision, mission and functions of the police institution. The National Police was organized into a General, under the command of a National Headquarters and operate in accordance with the provisions of the Constitution, laws and regulations.

At the end of the 1990s National Police worked to its modernization and development and with the support of the Kingdom of Sweden launched the Modernization, Development and Training Police Academy and the National Police of Nicaragua, there is apparent in 1999, the first institutional diagnosis allowing better understand the institutional reality to chart new challenges.

With a broader view of their situation: strengths, weaknesses, opportunities and threats, and security demands of the population, in 2000 the National Police designed the "Modernization and Development Programme for the strengthening of citizen security 2001 - 2005, "which had the support of the international community. In April 2013, Nicaraguan police arrested Eric Justin Toth, an American fugitive wanted by the FBI for possession of child pornography. Toth was arrested by the National Police after in Estelí on 10 April 2013. Toth had replaced Osama bin Laden in placement on the FBI's Ten Most Wanted Fugitives.

On 28 June 2018, the US government demanded the Nicaraguan government return police vehicles supplied by the US to Nicaragua after allegations of human rights abuses being carried out by the national police, the government of Nicaragua complied and turned in 4 Toyota pickups and a bus.

In March 2020, the United States imposed sanctions on the National Police claiming the police committed human rights abuses, including allegations of using live ammunition on protesters, operating death squads, and taking part in extrajudicial killings and kidnappings. The US government also blacklisted Police commissioners. The government of Nicaragua claimed the sanctions were part of US imperialist harassment against Nicaragua.

=== The five strategic challenges that plan are drawn ===
1. Improve the effectiveness of the intervention model, capacity and efficiency in addressing common crime and organized crime.
2. Strengthen links between the police and the community to improve coexistence and citizen security.
3. Optimize the model and institutional management, financial management system, coverage and service quality, and strengthen the institutional infrastructure.
4. Modernize the system of personnel management and human resource development, strengthening the organizational culture.
5. Update and supplement the legal framework. The development objective of the plan is to strengthen democratic governance and judicial security in Nicaragua, and respect for human rights of the population, through the institutional consolidation of the National Police and the improvement of their services, to thus help create the conditions that enable poor people to improve their quality of life.

With the assumption of the First Commissioner Aminta Granera in the National Headquarters in September 2006, adjustments were made in this plan projecting its coverage until 2011, also establishing new strategic guidelines for police work.

It is in this context that the Director General was directed to work strategically to consolidate a strong police, dignified, according to law and dedication to service, whose diary do is to be closely linked to the community, because every police action has its reason for being in service to the community, hence their approach determines that the National Police has been working for the community by the community for the community.

The traffic division is known for stopping tourists and confiscating their licenses in lieu of extracting a bribe. It is then the practice of the bureaucratic arm of the police to obfuscate the retrieval of said licenses by their victims.

== Structure ==
=== Female component ===
The Nicaragua National Police has one of the highest men to women ratios in the world, with a one time high of nearly 35% women participation in the police. After sinking to a 17% low in the 1990s, the percent has climbed to the internationally competitive 30%. Despite this being a tough job for women, the women themselves and government find it very important due to protecting women and women's rights.

=== Directors General of National Police ===
- Guerrilla Commander and Brigade René Vivas Lugo (1979-1982 and 1989-1992).
- Guerrilla Commander and Brigade Walter Ferreti Fonseca (1982-1985).
- Commander Doris Tijerino Haslam (1985-1988).
- First Commissioner Fernando Caldera Azmitia, Director General PN (1992-1996).
- First Commissioner Franco Montealegre, Director General PN (1996-2001).
- First Commissioner Edwin Cordero Ardila, Director General PN (2001-2006).
- First Commissioner Aminta Elena Granera Sacasa, Director General PN (2006-2018).
- First Commissioner Francisco Javier Díaz Madriz, Current Director of the PN (2018-)

=== Ranks ===
Officers

Rank group	General / flag officers		Senior officers			Junior officers
	Oficiales generales		Oficiales superiores			Oficiales subalternos
National Police of Nicaragua
National Police of Nicaragua	Primer comisionado	Comisionado general	Comisionado mayor	Comisionado	Sub-comisionado	Capitán	Teniente primero	Inspector

Others

	Ejecutivos
National Police of Nicaragua
National Police of Nicaragua	Sub-inspector	Sub-oficial mayor	Sub-oficial	Policía

== Equipment ==
=== Small arms ===
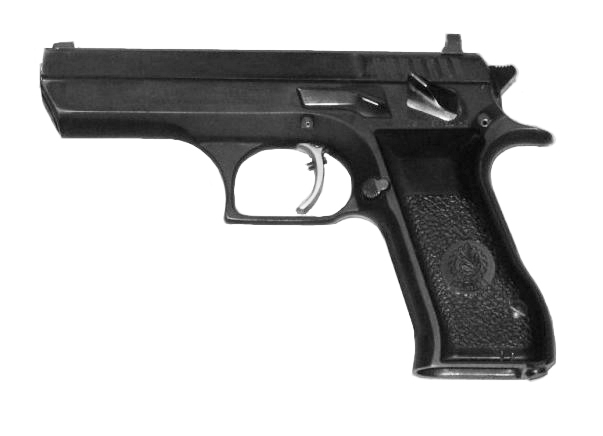
Jericho 941 pistol

==== Pistols ====
- Beretta 92
- Smith & Wesson Model 10
- IWI Jericho 941

==== Rifles ====
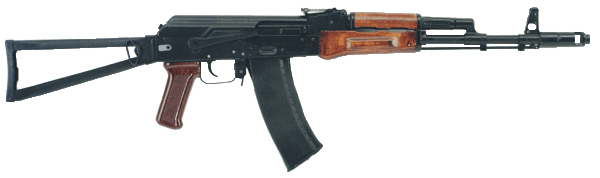
AK-74 rifle with folding stock used by Nicaraguan National Police

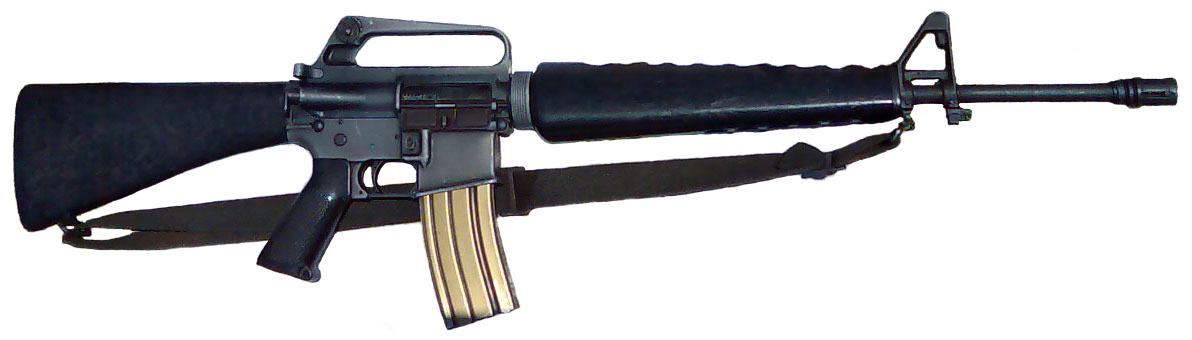
M16A1 rifle

- AK-47
- AK-74
- M16
- M16A1
- FN FAL

===== Sniper rifles =====
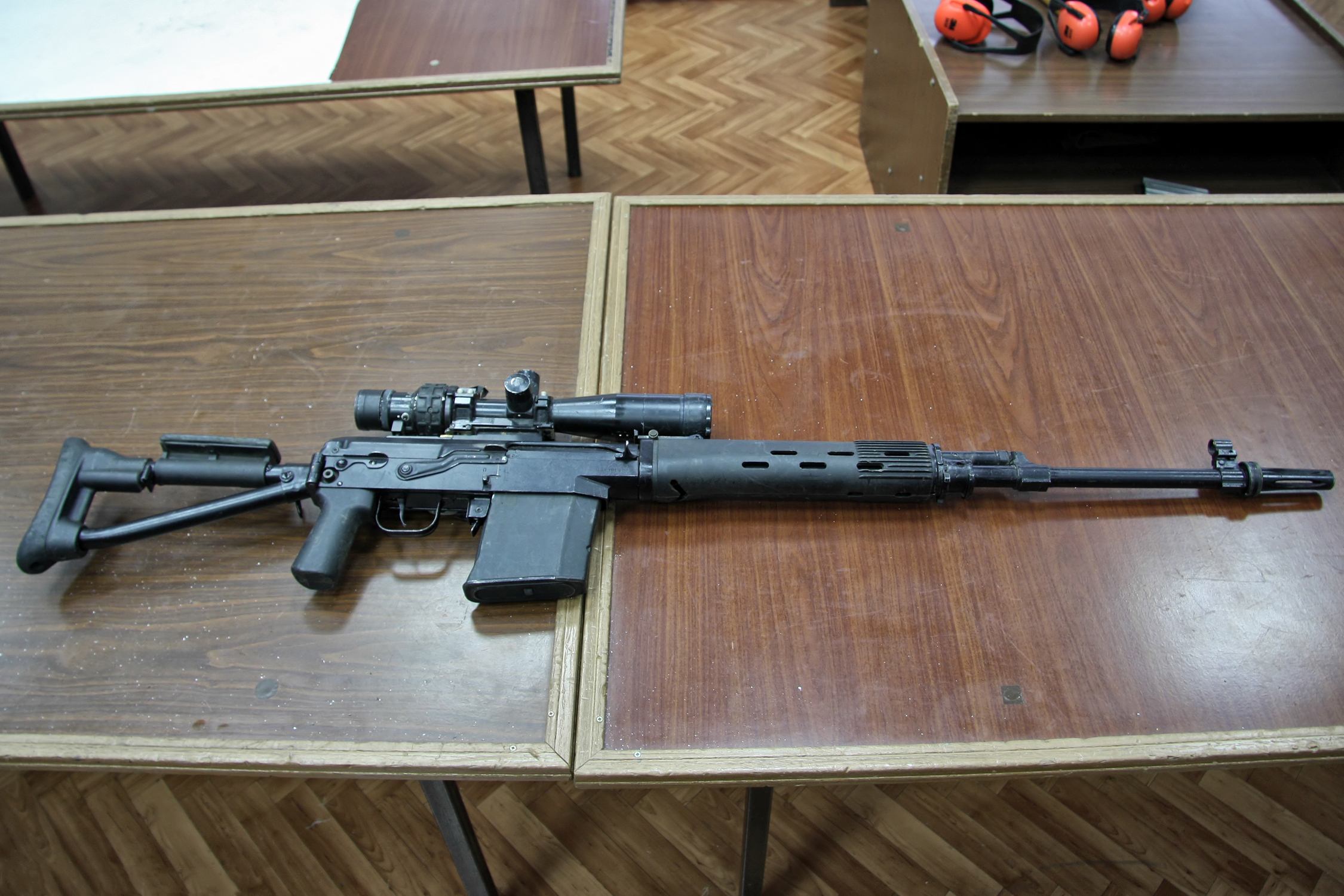
Dragunov SVD used by Nicaraguan police snipers

- Remington Model 700
- Dragunov
- M24 SWS

==== Light machine guns ====
- PKM

==== Shotguns ====
- Mossberg 500

=== Launchers ===
- RPG-7
- M79 grenade launcher

=== Vehicles ===
- Toyota Hilux
- Toyota Land Cruiser

=== Communication equipment ===
- MOTOTRBO DP4800 radio
- MOTOTRBO XPR 7000 radio
- Tait TP8100 series radio
