= Lists of Macedonians =

There are several lists of Macedonians, people who live or lived in the region of Macedonia:

- List of Macedonians (ethnic group)
- List of Macedonians (Greek)
- List of Macedonian Bulgarians
- List of Macedonian Turks
- List of ancient Macedonians
- List of Macedonian Americans

== See also ==
- Macedonia (disambiguation)
- Macedonia (terminology)
