= Distributed Systems Technology Centre =

Research organization

Distributed Systems Technology Centre (DSTC)
- Industry: Distributed Computing Research
- Founded: 1992
- Defunct: 30 June 2006
- Fate: Failed to receive continued funding
- Headquarters: Brisbane, Australia
- Products: Elvin

The Distributed Systems Technology Centre (DSTC) was a leading research organization in the field of information technology in Australia. It conducted applied research focusing on a number of application domains, such as government, defence and health care. It was a centre of excellence in distributed systems technologies and had an international reputation as one of the most effective and influential IT research organisations in Australia.

DSTC was supported by the Australian Government's Cooperative Research Centre (CRC) program and participants included universities, government, and industry players.

The company DSTC Pty Ltd was created in 1992 to manage the CRC for Distributed Systems Technology. It completed its research program in June 2000. A second CRC was established in July 2000: the CRC for Enterprise Distributed System Technology which was also managed by DSTC Pty Ltd. This CRC completed its operations on 30 June 2006.

DSTC was one of the most successful CRCs in Australia, and was a leading centre for expertise in distributed systems and information technology. It was a major contributor to the Australian information technology industry through its research, projects with industry, support for training and education. It organised the annual Evolve Conference, which brought leading international experts to Australia. It was a strong participant in international standards organisations such as the Object Management Group (OMG), World Wide Web Consortium (W3C) and Organization for the Advancement of Structured Information Standards (OASIS). The DSTC started and hosted the Australian W3C Office.

== Spin-offs ==
Several spin-off companies were created from DSTC projects :

- In 1997, Active Tools commercialised Nimrod, a tool for performing parameterised computations in a grid, as EnFuzion. EnFuzion is now owned and distributed by Axceleon.
- In 2001, Wedgetail Communications commercialised several security products including μPKI, a PKI library for small devices, and a Java Crypto and Security Implementation (JCSI) Single Sign-On product. In 2004, the company was bought by Vintela, which in 2005 was in turn bought by Quest Software.
- In 2003, Mantara commercialised Elvin, a light-weight event notification service. In 2013, Mantara was effectively acquired by Deutsche Bank.
- In 2004, Extensia Solutions commercialised the RecordPoint shared electronic health record system.
- In 2006, distIP purchased some of the remaining intellectual property assets of DSTC. Trading as Veriluma, it commercialised the Sheba modeling system for intelligence assessment.

In addition to these commercial ventures, one of DSTC's greatest legacies is its alumni, some of whom have taken on prominent positions in academia, whilst others have found employment in some of the world's leading ICT companies. DSTC also made a massive contribution to computer science education, playing a major role in the education of many computer science students (including a large number of PhDs) in Australia, and particularly in Brisbane.

The CEO of DSTC in the early years had a prominent position in Queensland politics, which led to DSTC getting a few mentions in the Queensland parliament. Queensland premier Rob Borbidge dismissively referred to DSTC as "a sort of gigabyte playpen for a few propeller heads" (Hansard 1996), which DSTC staff adopted as an informal motto.

Its website was archived following its closure in June 2006.

== See also ==
- Cooperative Research Centres (CRCs)
