= Elvin (surname) =

Elvin is a surname, as is Elvins. Notable people with these surnames include:

Elvin

- Sir Arthur Elvin MBE (1899–1957), British businessman
- George Elvin (1907–1984), British trade unionist
- Herbert Henry Elvin (1874–1949), British trade unionist
- Joe Elvin (1862–1935), English comedian and music hall entertainer
- Lionel Elvin (1905–2005), British educationist
- Mark Elvin (1938–2023), English and Australian academic
- Suryakumari Elvin (1925–2005), Indian singer, actress, and dancer
- Violetta Elvin (1923–2021), Russian-British prima ballerina and actress

Elvins

- Harold Elvins (1878–1943), Australian pianist
- Mark Elvins (1939–2014), Catholic Warden of Greyfriars, Oxford
- Rob Elvins (born 1986), English professional footballer

== See also ==
- Elvin (service), distributed event routing service using a publish/subscribe event delivery model
- Elvin (given name)
