= Elvan (disambiguation) =

Elvan is the native variety of quartz-porphyry in Cornwall and Devon, England.

Elvan may also refer to:

== Given name ==
- St Elvan, a possibly legendary 2nd-century British saint
- St Elvan, another name for St Elwen of Cornwall
- Eluan Powys (Elvan of Powys), a seventh century character named throughout Llywarch Hen's englyn-poem, Canu Heledd.
- Elvan Abeylegesse (born 1982), Ethiopian-Turkish female track and field athlete

== Surname ==
- Berkin Elvan (1999–2014), Turkish boy died in coma after a tear-gas cartridge fired by police hit his head
- Lütfi Elvan (born 1962), Turkish mining engineer, politician and government minister

== Others ==
- Elvan (soft drink), Turkish soft drink brand
- Elvan Water, a stream in Scotland

== See also ==
- Elven (disambiguation)
