= Margarita Tamargo-Sanchez =

Cuban pharmacist (1915–2005)

- Born: 30 September 1915; Havana, Cuba
- Died: 2 October 2005 (aged 90); Miami, Florida USA

Dr. Margarita Tamargo-Sanchez (September 30, 1915 in Havana, Cuba – October 2, 2005 in Miami, Florida) was a prominent pharmacist and bacteriologist in Cuba.

Dr. Tamargo-Sanchez was the daughter of Domingo Tamargo-Bautista (1883–1947) and Gloria Sanchez-del Monte (1888–1963). She never married but had three siblings, Ana Gloria (1910–1996) (wife of Francisco Diaz-Silveira Lopez), Domingo Alberto (1913–2002), and Alberto (1919–1984).

She graduated from University of Havana in 1939, obtaining a doctorate in pharmacy, and became the director of the pharmacy department of the anti-tuberculosis Children's Hospital in Havana. In 1949, she won a scholarship to further studies specialized in bacteriology with Sir Alexander Fleming, who discovered penicillin, becoming the first Cuban woman to obtain this scholarship. She studied under the direction of Dr. Fleming at St. Mary's Hospital in the University of London and, later, Dr. Fleming and his wife visited Tamargo-Sanchez and her family in Cuba, where, at her request, he lectured at the University of Havana.

She came to the United States in 1968 and worked at Mount Sinai Hospital, New York, until her retirement in 1980. She then spent her last 22 years in Miami with her family.
