= Francisco Javier Díaz Madriz =

Nicaraguan National Police chief

Director General of the National Police of Nicaragua
- Incumbent
- Assumed office August 23, 2018
- Preceded by: Aminta Granera Sacasa
- Appointed by: Daniel Ortega

Personal details
- Born: Chinandega, Nicaragua

Francisco Javier Díaz Madriz is the Director General of the National Police of Nicaragua. He was appointed by president Daniel Ortega on July 5, 2018, following Aminta Granera's resignation from the position in the face of mass protests across Nicaragua and the widespread criticism of the aggressive police response that followed. The appointment became public August 23 and Díaz was officially sworn in on September 5, 2018.

Díaz was sanctioned by the U.S. State Department on July 5, 2018—a few hours before the decree appointing Díaz Director-General—under the Magnitsky Act for what the State Department called "serious human rights abuse against the people of Nicaragua" by police under his supervision during the protests.

Díaz and Ortega are related through their children's marriage.
