= Elvin Grey =

Russian singer (born 1989)

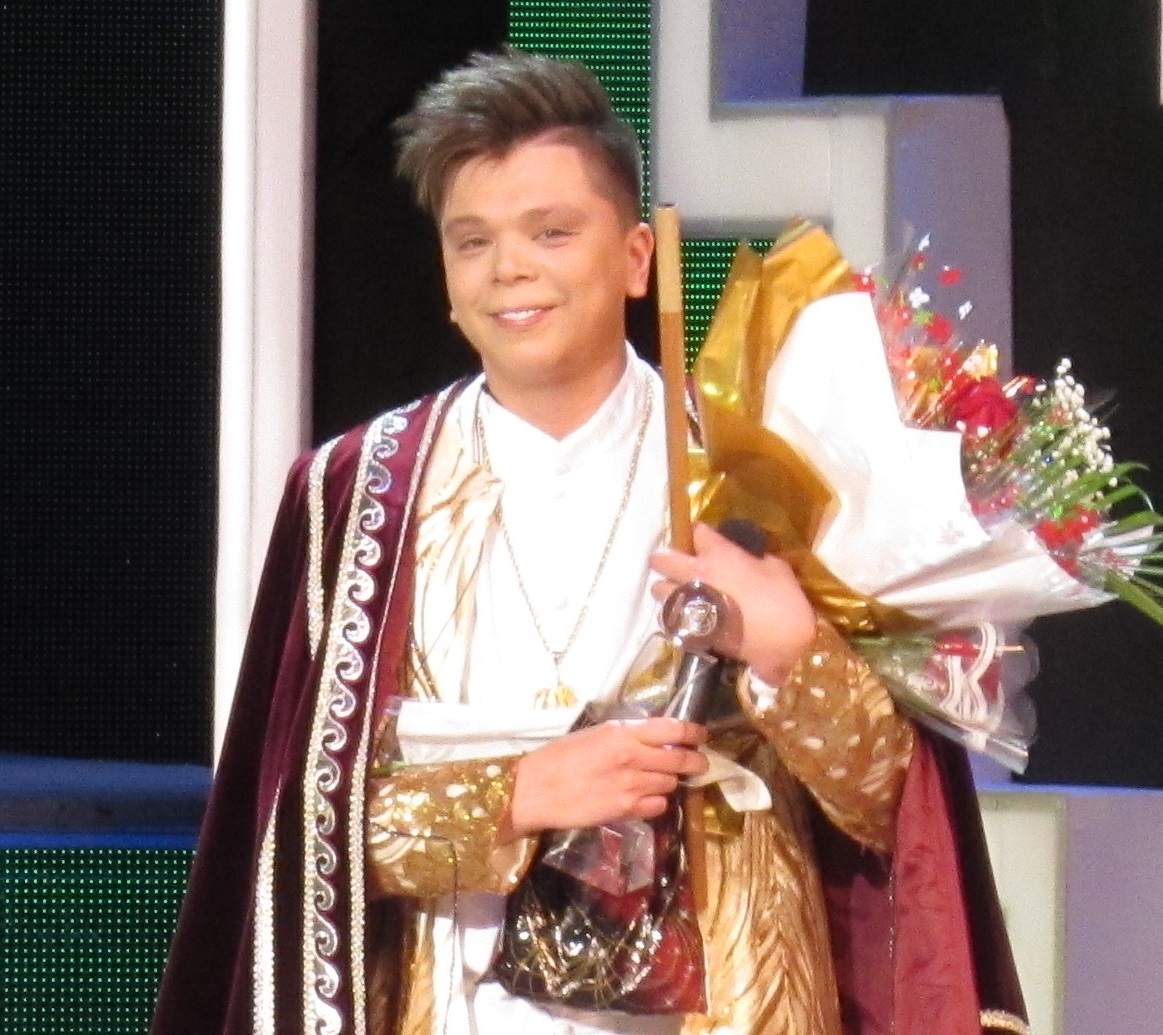
- 2017

Background information
- Birth name: Radik Yulyakshin
- Born: 17 May 1989 (age 35); Ufa, Bashkir ASSR, Russian SFSR, Soviet Union
- Genres: Pop, Bashkir music, Tatar music
- Occupation: Singer
- Instruments: vocals
- Years active: 2006–present
- Labels: Atlantic Records Russia, "Elvin Grey" Music Label

Elvin Grey (Bashkir: Элвин Грей) is the stage name of Radik Yulyakshin (Bashkir: Радик Юлъяҡшин, Russian: Радик Юльякшин), a Russian pop singer and producer of Bashkir descent.

Radik Yulyakshin was born in Ufa into an ethnic Bashkir construction worker family. He graduated from the Moscow State Pedagogical University.

== Career ==
In 2006, he released his first album. Every year between 2006 and 2012, Yulyakshin was named Singer of the Year in Bashkortostan. In 2011, he relocated to Moscow. In 2016, Yulyakshin was named Person of Culture of the Year in Tatarstan.

In 2017, he received the title Merited Artist of Bashkortostan.

In 2017, the name of Radik Yulyakshin was included in the Bashkir language textbook.

In 2020, Head of the Republic of Bashkortostan Radiy Khabirov, appointed the singer as his adviser on cultural development and youth policy.

== Awards ==
- 2006-2012 - "Singer of the Year in Bashkortostan"
- 2012 - Grand Prix "Hit of the year in Bashkortostan"
- 2013 - Finalist of the All—Russian competition of young performers "I am an artist"
- 2017 - Honored Artist of the Republic of Bashkortostan
- 2024 - People's Artist of the Republic of Bashkortostan
