= Yahya Kemal College =

Private secondary school in Skopje, North Macedonia

The Yahya Kemal College is the first private high school in Skopje, North Macedonia. The high school was established in 1996 and bears the name of the great Turkish writer and poet Yahya Kemal Beyatlı, who was born in Skopje in 1884 and was one of the most eminent figures in Turkish literature. Shortly after the inauguration the school obtained the interest and appreciation of Macedonian people, because of the achievements and awards it gathered. The Turkish College, as it is popularly known, offers education at primary and high school level and is bestowed with the title of 'first and biggest private educational institution' in North Macedonia. The number of enrolled students increases for few times each year. The college has six branches: in Avtokomanda (established 1996), Gostivar (established 1999), Struga (established 2002), Butel (established 2007), Strumica (established 2010), and Bogovinje, Tetovo (established 2011).

== Education system ==
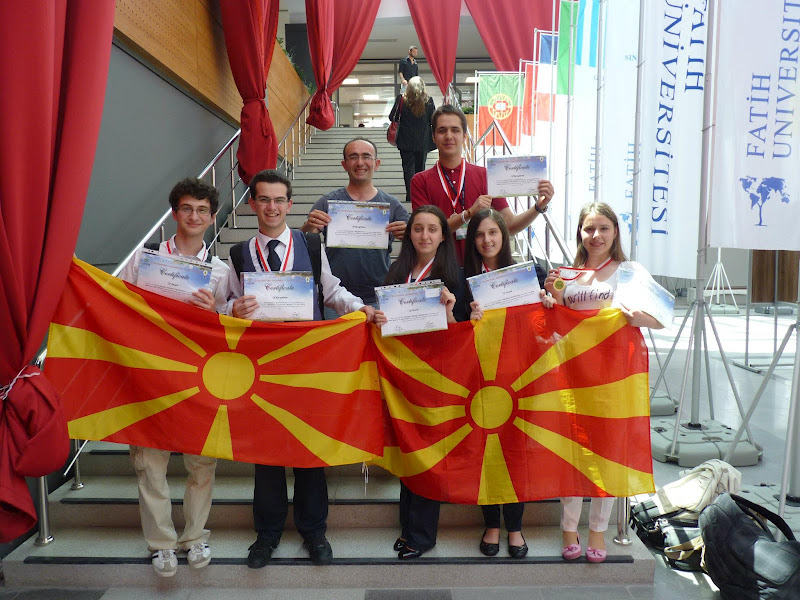
Awarded students of Yahya Kemal College at INEPO closing ceremony at Fatih University in Istanbul, Turkey

Yahya Kemal College is a co-educational, English medium, day school whose curriculum corresponds to that of the Turkish Anatolian Science High Schools curriculum. Yahya Kemal Junior School follows the state curriculum enriched with extra IT and English language classes. Four languages (English, Macedonian, Turkish and Albanian) are used in lessons; three are taught as mother tongue classes (Macedonian, Albanian and Turkish). During the first year of the four-year high school education, students are given intensive English and Turkish courses. As a result of this policy, the students are able to learn and speak both languages fluently. The results obtained by the students in the international language exams like TOEFL and TOMER are a clear indication of this success.

== Enrollment policy ==
A school entrance exam is conducted every year to select the students to be enrolled at Yahya Kemal College. The students who succeed getting the first places in this exam earn the right of admission. The primary school, Yahya Kemal Junior, enrolls students without an entrance exam.
