= Domingo Tamargo =

Cuban politician (1883–1947)

Domingo Rafael Tamargo y Bautista
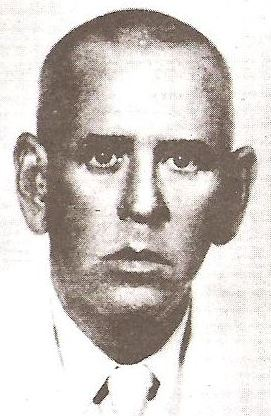

26th Secretary of Justice of Cuba
- Preceded by: Joaquin del Rio Balmaseda
- Succeeded by: Luis F. de Almaego y Eliazaga

Personal details
- Born: 2 May 1883 Matanzas, Cuba
- Died: 1947 (aged 63–64) Havana, Cuba
- Spouse: Gloria Sanchez del Montes
- Children: Ana Gloria, Domingo, Alberto, and Margarita Tamargo-Sanchez
- Occupation: Attorney

Domingo Rafael Tamargo y Bautista (2 May 1883 – 1947) was the Cuban Secretary of Justice during the early 1930s. He served on the Cuban Supreme Court from September 27, 1933 until January 17, 1934.

Tamargo was born in Matanzas, Cuba to a wealthy Spaniard, Manuel Antonio Tamargo y Gonzalez (1836–1914), and Cuban Ana Josefa Bautista y Valera. He married Gloria Sanchez del Montes and they had four children, Ana Gloria (1910–1996), Domingo (1913–2002), Alberto (1917–1984), and Margarita Tamargo-Sanchez (1915–2005).

Legal offices
Preceded by Joaquin del Rio Balmaseda	Secretary of Justice	Succeeded by Luis F. de Almaego y Eliazaga
