= Elvin J. Cassell =

American football coach (1896–1970)

Biographical details
- Born: December 3, 1896; Alexandria, Minnesota, U.S.
- Died: August 28, 1970 (aged 73); Jamestown, North Dakota, U.S.

Playing career

Football
- 1921–1924: Carleton

Baseball
- 1922–1925: Carleton
- Positions: Halfback (football); Pitcher (baseball)

Coaching career (HC unless noted)

Football
- 1926–1929: Olivet
- 1930–1946: Jamestown
- 1951–1953: Jamestown

Basketball
- 1926–1928: Olivet
- 1930–1964: Jamestown

Administrative career (AD unless noted)
- 1925–1926: Epworth Military Academy
- ?–1930: Olivet
- 1930–1964: Jamestown

Head coaching record
- Overall: 73–69–18 (football)

Accomplishments and honors

Championships
- Football; 5 NDIAC/NDIC (1933–1935, 1941, 1952)

Elvin John "Al" Cassell (December 3, 1896 – August 28, 1970) was an American college football and college basketball coach and athletics administrator. He served as the head football coach at Olivet College in Olivet, Michigan from 1926 to 1929, and Jamestown College—now known as the University of Jamestown—in Jamestown, North Dakota, from 1930 to 1946 and again from 1951 to 1953. His football record at Jamestown was 65–49–13. Cassell was also the athletic director and head basketball coach at Jamestown from 1930 to 1964.

A native of Alexandria, Minnesota, Cassell was a four-sport star in high school. He attended Carleton College in Northfield, Minnesota, where he lettered four times each in football and baseball. He was a pitcher in baseball and also ran track. Cassell graduated from Carleton in 1925 and served as athletic director at Epworth Military Academy in Epworth, Iowa from 1925 to 1926.

After retiring from Jamestown in 1964, Cassell worked in life insurance sales and in scouting for the Minnesota Twins of Major League Baseball (MLB). He died on August 28, 1970.

== Head coaching record ==
=== Football ===
| Year | Team | Overall | Conference | Standing | Bowl/playoffs |
|---|---|---|---|---|---|
Olivet Crimson (Michigan Intercollegiate Athletic Association) (1926–1929)
| 1926 | Olivet | 1–5–1 | 1–3 | T–4th | |
| 1927 | Olivet | 1–7 | 1–4 | T–5th | |
| 1928 | Olivet | 1–4–3 | 0–3–2 | T–4th | |
| 1929 | Olivet | 3–4–1 | 1–3–1 | 4th | |
| Olivet: | | 8–20–5 | 3–13–3 | | |
Jamestown Jimmies (Interstate Athletic Conference) (1930–1931)
| 1930 | Jamestown | 3–4 | 2–3 | 6th | |
| 1931 | Jamestown | 5–2–1 | | | |
Jamestown Jimmies (North Dakota Intercollegiate Athletic Conference / North Dakota Intercollegiate Conference) (1932–1946)
| 1932 | Jamestown | 2–1–2 | 1–1–2 | 5th | |
| 1933 | Jamestown | 5–1–1 | 5–0–1 | 1st | |
| 1934 | Jamestown | 6–2 | 5–0 | 1st | |
| 1935 | Jamestown | 5–1–1 | 4–0–1 | 1st | |
| 1936 | Jamestown | 4–3–1 | 2–1–1 | 3rd | |
| 1937 | Jamestown | 4–3–1 | 3–1–1 | 3rd | |
| 1938 | Jamestown | 2–5–1 | 2–2–1 | 4th | |
| 1939 | Jamestown | 2–5–1 | 1–3–1 | T–5th | |
| 1940 | Jamestown | 4–2–1 | 3–1–1 | 2nd | |
| 1941 | Jamestown | 6–2 | 5–0 | 1st | |
| 1942 | Jamestown | 4–2–1 | 3–1 | 2nd | |
| 1943 | No team—World War II | | | | |
| 1944 | No team—World War II | | | | |
| 1945 | Jamestown | 2–1 | | | |
| 1946 | Jamestown | 2–4–1 | 2–2–1 | 4th | |
Jamestown Jimmies (North Dakota Intercollegiate Conference) (1951–1953)
| 1951 | Jamestown | 1–5–1 | 1–3–1 | 6th | |
| 1952 | Jamestown | 5–2 | 5–1 | T–1st | |
| 1953 | Jamestown | 3–4 | 3–3 | 5th | |
| Jamestown: | | 65–49–13 | | | |
| Total: | | 73–69–18 | | | |
National championship Conference title Conference division title or championship game berth
