= Elfin =

Elfin may refer to:

- ELFIN, a CubeSat developed by University of California, Los Angeles
- Elfin (steamboat), a steamboat that ran on Lake Washington from 1891 to 1900
- Elfin of Alt Clut, ruler of Alt Clut, seventh century Scotland
- Elfin, a character from the video game The Peace Keepers
- Elfin forests, dwarfed plant ecosystems
- Elfin rabbit, a domestic rabbit breed
- Elfin Sports Cars, an Australian sports car manufacturer
- Elfin Team, a hacking group
- HMS Elfin, one of several British Royal Navy ships
- USS Elfin, one of several United States Navy ships
- Elfins, North American members of the butterfly genus Callophrys

== See also ==
- Elf
- Elphin (disambiguation)
- Elven (disambiguation)
- Williams syndrome, a syndrome characterized by an elfin facial appearance
