= Michael Scionti =

American politician

Michael J Scionti
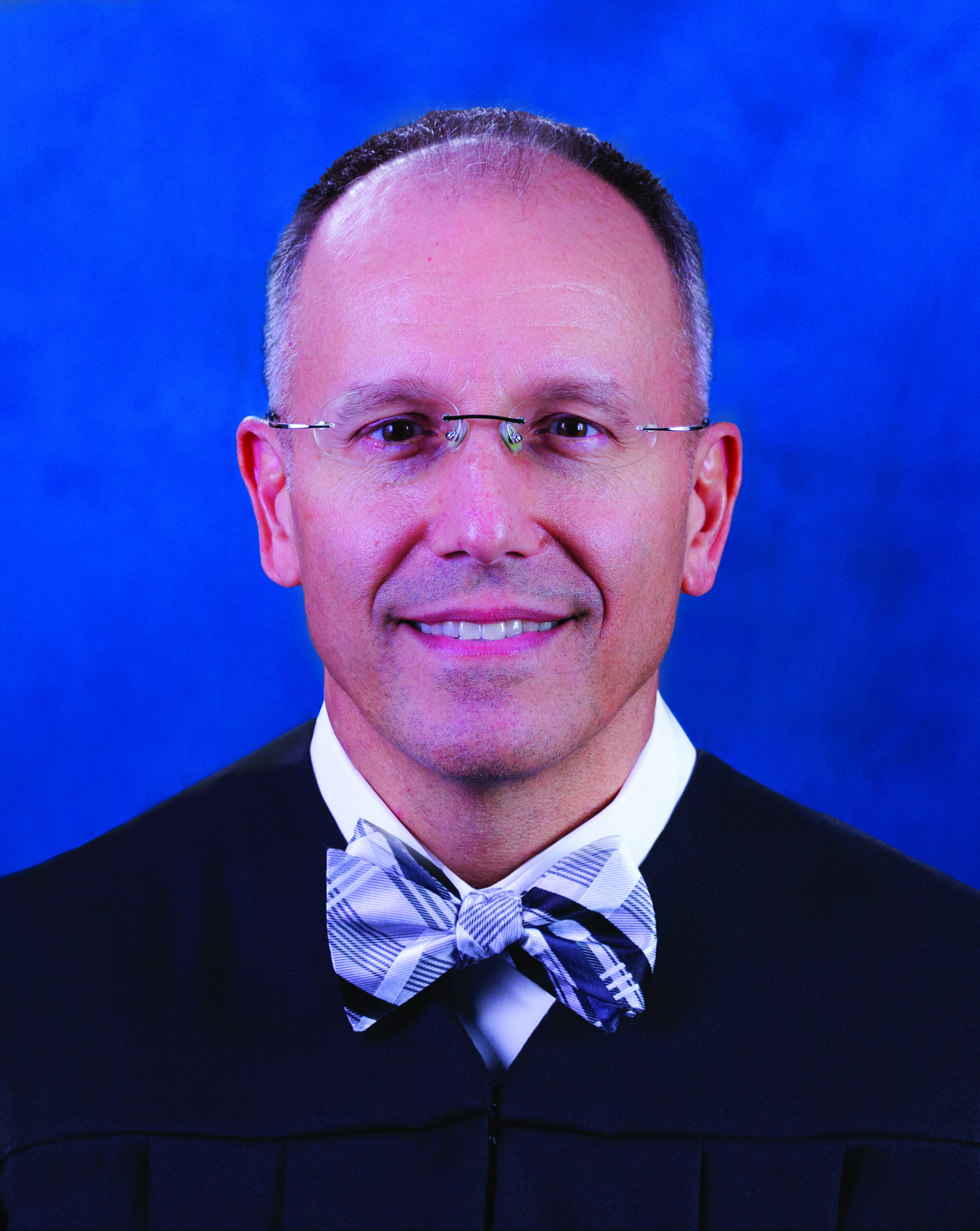

Circuit Court Judge for the Thirteenth Judicial Circuit of Florida
- Incumbent
- Assumed office 2015

Michael J. Scionti is an American judge, former politician, former U.S. Department of Defense official, and Colonel in the United States Army Reserve. Scionti is the Circuit Court Judge for the Thirteenth Judicial Circuit Court of Florida.

Scionti served in the Florida House of Representatives from 2006 to 2010 as a Democrat.

After departing the legislature, Scionti served with the United States Department of Defense as the deputy assistant secretary for Homeland Defense and Intergovernmental Affairs, overseeing the development of legislative strategies and priorities for domestic policies and programs relating to matters of national security and homeland defense, and as a diplomat with the United States Department of State. Scionti serves in the United States Army Reserve Judge Advocate General's Corps with the rank of Colonel.

In 2014, he was elected as a judge to the Thirteenth Judicial Circuit Court of Florida.
