= Monica Elfvin =

Swedish gymnast

Personal information
- Nationality: Swedish
- Born: 22 November 1938 (age 86); Gothenburg, Sweden

Sport
- Sport: Gymnastics

Monica Elfvin later Nökleby (born 22 November 1938) is a Swedish gymnast. She competed in six events at the 1960 Summer Olympics.
