= Elvin Hasan =

Macedonian politician

- Елвин Хасан

Government minister without Portfolio for Attracting foreign investment of the Republic of Macedonia
- Incumbent
- Assumed office 26 December 2018
- President: Gjorge Ivanov; Stevo Pendarovski
- Prime Minister: Zoran Zaev; Dimitar Kovačevski

Personal details
- Born: 10 April 1985 (age 40) Štip, SFR Yugoslavia (today North Macedonia)
- Citizenship: Macedonian
- Party: Macedonia Turkish Movement Party

Elvin Hasan (born 10 April 1985), is a Macedonian politician. He serves as Government minister without Portfolio for Attracting foreign investment of the Republic of Macedonia. He is of Turkish descent. He is vice president of Macedonia Turkish Movement Party (MTHP). He has been actively involved in social activities and political developments in the non-governmental sector and the MTHP from an early age.

== Early life ==
Hasan was born on 10 April 1985 in Štip.

He finished his primary and secondary education in Radovish, and graduated from the Faculty of Education Sciences at UGD in Shtip.

Focusing on education management, he completed his Master's studies and obtained his PhD at the Institute for Pedagogy at UKIM, in Skopje.

In 2016, he finished his postgraduate studies at the Institute of Educational Sciences (Management of Education and Public Policy) at the State University of Ankara, Republic of Turkey. He was the deputy director of the State Examination Center, from where he was appointed Minister of State.

== Career ==
From 2011 to 2013 he was vice president of the non-governmental organization “UFUK”. From 2013 to 2016 he was secretary, from 2016 to 2018 president, mainly establishing links with institutions, non-governmental organizations and chambers of commerce from the Republic of Turkey, the Balkans and countries of the Turkish Diaspora.

From 2012 to 2014, he was the editor-in-chief of the magazine Ufuk in Macedonian, from 2014 to 2015 he was editor-in-chief of Ufuk Dergisi in Turkish, which is of international character. Since 2016 he was the editor- in-chief of the portal and e-magazine Haber Macedonia.

In education, he worked as a Turkish teacher, he was the assistant of the Turkish language and literature group at the Faculty of Philology at Goce Delčev University of Štip, and was engaged at the Faculty of Education “Kliment Ohridski” in Skopje, as well as International Vision University in Gostivar.

He is a member of the Macedonia Turkish Movement Party, a permanent partner of the Social Democrats. Since 19 November 2017 he was part of Macedonia Turkish Movement Party central management, and he was elected vice president of the party on November 17, 2018.
