= Francisco Diaz-Silveira Lopez =

Cuban attorney (1908–1996)

- Born: October 4, 1908; Havana, Cuba
- Died: April 1996 (aged 87); Miami, Florida, U.S.

Francisco Diaz-Silveira Lopez (October 4, 1908 – April 1996) was a prominent abogado-notario (attorney-notary) in Havana, Cuba from the 1930s, until the Cuban Revolution of 1959.

He was the son of Francisco Diaz-Silveira and Dolores Lopez. He was married to Ana Gloria Tamargo-Sanchez (May 5, 1910 – May 1996). They divorced and neither remarried; they had three children, Ana Gloria, Jorge, and Francisco Diaz-Silveira Tamargo.
