= Elvin Martinez =

American politician

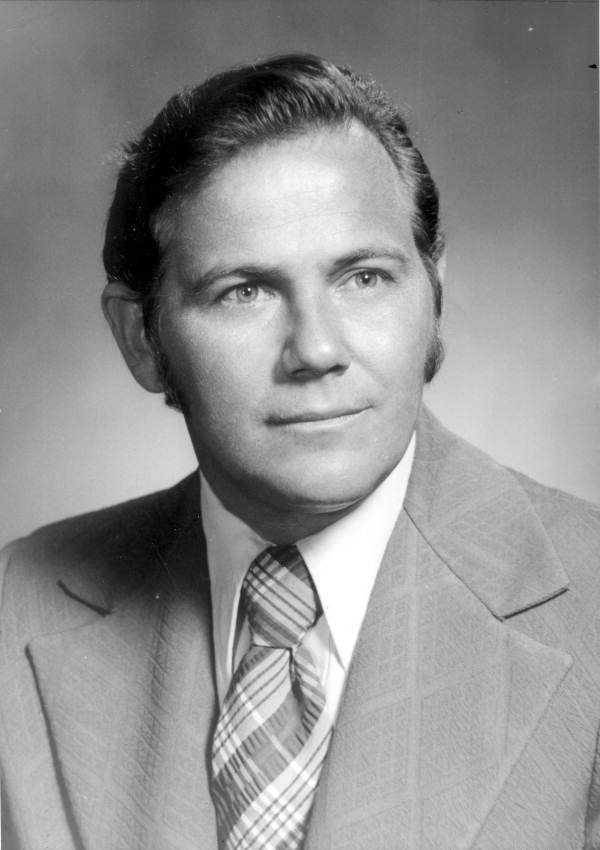

Member of the Florida House of Representatives
- In office 1966–1998

Personal details
- Born: August 8, 1934 (age 91) Tampa, Florida
- Party: Democratic
- Occupation: attorney

Elvin L. Martinez (born August 8, 1934) is an American politician and attorney in the state of Florida.

Martinez was born in West Tampa. He attended the University of Tampa and law school at Stetson University. He served in the Florida House of Representatives from 1966 to 1998. He is a member of the Democratic Party.
