= Francisco Díaz-Silveira =

Cuban journalist, writer and poet (1871–1925)

Francisco Diaz-Silveira
- Born: February 4, 1871; Havana, Cuba
- Died: February 16, 1925 (aged 54); Havana, Cuba

Francisco Díaz-Silveira (February 4, 1871 - February 16, 1925) was a well known Cuban journalist, writer and poet.

Diaz-Silveira was born in Havana, Cuba. When he was thirteen years old he emigrated to Key West, Florida, with his family for political reasons. For a time he was a cigar worker. He was secretary of the Club San Carlos in Key West. During the Cuban War of 1895, he returned to Cuba in the expedition of Carlos Roloff and Serafíín Sanchez. He was the Representative of the western Cuba in the Assembly of Jimaguayú and head of office of the Ministry of the Interior. He was eventually promoted to rank of colonel in the cavalry.

He was part of the writing staff of La Nacion (1898–1899) from Mapos, Sancti Spíritus (the Villas). In 1912, he became co-editor with Carvallo Miyeres the weekly paper El Teatro, which in the following year he became the sole editor and renamed it Universal.

During this same period he carried out diverse public positions, to which he soon resigned due to political differences. Later, persuaded by friends and ex-combatants, he returned to the public life and he held administrative positions within the municipality of Havana.

He collaborated in various magazines and newspapers such as El Yara, La Discusion, El Figaro, Cuba y America, Azul y Rojo, and Letras. He translated works such as Carducci and Lord Byron among other authors.

He died in Havana, aged 54.

== Family life ==
He was married to Dolores Lopez and had six children: María, Elena, Carlos, Lydia, Olga and Francisco Diaz-Silviera Lopez.
