= Elwyn =

Elwyn is a surname and a male given name. It may refer to:

== As a surname ==
- Alfred L. Elwyn (1804–1884), American physician and philanthropist
- Dilys Elwyn-Edwards (1918–2012), Welsh composer and lecturer
- Glyn Elwyn, professor
- John Elwyn (1916–1997), Welsh painter
- Lizzie May Elwyn, American dramatist
- Michael Elwyn (born 1942), Welsh actor
- Thomas Elwyn (c. 1837–1888), Canadian politician

== As a given name ==
- Elwyn Berlekamp (1940–2019), American mathematician
- Elwyn Brook-Jones (1911–1962), British actor
- Elwyn Crocker Jr. (died 2016), American murder victim
- Elwyn Davies (1908–1986), Welsh author
- Elwyn Thurman Gaskill (1935–2023), American politician
- Elwyn Hartley Edwards (1927–2007), British equestrian author and judge
- Elwyn Flint (1910–1983), Australian linguist
- Elwyn Friedrich (1933–2012), Swiss ice hockey player
- Elwyn Gwyther (1921–1996), Welsh rugby union player
- Elwyn Hughes, Welsh academic
- Elwyn John (1936–2013), Welsh Anglican priest
- Elwyn Jones, multiple people
- Elwyn Roy King (1894–1941), Australian fighter ace
- Elwyn Lee, American academic, husband of politician Sheila Jackson Lee
- Elwyn Lynn (1917–1997), Australian artist and author
- Elwyn McRoy, American basketball player-coach
- Elwyn Meader (1910–1996), American botanist
- Elwyn Morris (1921–2000), Canadian ice hockey player
- Elwyn Richardson (1925–2012), New Zealand educator
- Elwyn Roberts (1931–2009), Welsh Anglican priest
- Elwyn B. Robinson (1905–1985), American historian
- Elwyn E. Royce (1868–1960), American farmer and politician
- Elwyn Seelye (1848–1920), American historian
- Elwyn R. Shaw (1888–1950), American judge
- Elwyn L. Simons (1930–2016), American paleontologist
- Elwyn Thomas (1894–1971), American judge
- Elwyn Bernard Thomas (born 1945), Welsh Anglican priest
- Elwyn Tinklenberg (born 1950), American politician
- Elwyn Vaughan (born 1965), Welsh politician
- Elwyn Walters (born 1943), Australian rugby player
- Elwyn Watkins (1963–2024), English politician
- Elwyn Welch (1925–1961), New Zealand conservationist and missionary
- Elwyn Brooks White (1899–1985), American author
- Saint Elwyn, an early saint or saints in Cornwall or Brittany

== Other uses ==
=== Organizations ===
- Elwyn Inc., an American non-profit
  - Israel Elwyn, the Israeli affiliate of the non-profit

=== Places ===
- Elwyn, Pennsylvania, an unincorporated community near Media
  - Elwyn station, a SEPTA Regional Rail station serving Elwyn
- Elwyn Creek, a river in British Columbia

=== Other ===
- SS St. Elwyn, a British steamship sunk in World War 2
- St Elwyn's Church, Hayle, an English church

== See also ==
- Elwin (disambiguation)
- Elven (disambiguation)
