= Alvina =

- Gender: female

Origin
- Meaning: elf friend

Other names
- See also: Alvin, Alva

Alvina is an English female given name with the meaning "elf friend", "amicable", "friendly". In English it is the feminine form of Alvin, which comes from the Old English name Ælfwine, containing the words ælf meaning "elf" and wine meaning "friend", or from the Old High German name Adelwin / Adalwin, meaning "noble friend".

It is an uncommon name, first attested in mediaeval English records, and was revived in the 20th century.

== Notable people with this name ==
- Anicée Alvina, French actress
- Alvina Costilla, American social worker and activist
- Alvina Gyulumyan (born 1956), Armenian judge
- Alvina Krause (1893–1981), American drama teacher and director
- Alvina Reynolds (born 1968), Saint Lucian politician, president of the Senate of Saint Lucia since 2022
- Alvina Shpady (1935–2019), Uzbekistani artist and art and textile restorer
- Juan Alvina Bezerra (born 2003), known as Juan Alvina, Brazilian footballer
- Viña Delmar ( Alvina Louise Croter; 1903–1990), American short story writer, novelist, playwright, and screenwriter

== Fictional characters ==
- Alvina Houghton, a character in The Lost Girl by D. H. Lawrence
- Alvina of the Darkroot Forest, a character in Dark Souls by From Software

== Variations ==
- Elvina
- Elvyna
- Elwina
- Elwyna

=== Male ===
- Elvis
- Elwin (disambiguation)
- Elwyn (disambiguation)
- Alvin
- Alwyn
- Elvin

=== Female ===
- Alveena
- Elvina (disambiguation)
- Elvena
- Vena (disambiguation)

== See also ==
- Anicée Alvina
