= Yorkshire Grey =

Yorkshire Grey may refer to:

- Yorkshire Grey Horse
- The Yorkshire Grey, a name of a public house
