= Alwyn =

Alwyn is a name, primarily used as a given name.

Notable people with the name include:

== Given name ==
- Alwyn Bramley-Moore (1878–1916), Canadian politician and soldier from Alberta
- Alwyn Cashe (1970–2005), Medal of Honor recipient
- Alwyn Davey (born 1984), Australian footballer
- Alwyn Eato (born 1929), English cricketer
- Alwyn Hamilton, author of Rebel of the Sands
- Alwyn Jones (biophysicist) (born 1947), Welsh biophysicist
- Alwyn Jones (athlete) (born 1985), Australian triple jumper
- Alwyn Kurts (1915–2000), Australian actor
- Alwyn MacArchill (12th century), a rannair to the King of Scots
- Alwyn Morris (born 1957), Canadian flatwater canoeist
- Alwyn Myburgh (born 1980), South African hurdler
- Alwyn Rice Jones (1934–2007), Archbishop of Wales
- Alwyn Schlebusch (1917–2008), South African politician
- Alwyn Scott (born 1963), American business journalist and editor
- Alwyn Sheppard Fidler CBE (1909–1990), Welsh architect and town planner
- Alwyn Wall, of British gospel beat group Malcolm and Alwyn
- Alwyn Williams (bishop) (1888–1968), Bishop of Durham and ofWinchester
- Alwyn Williams (geologist) (1921–2004), Welsh geologist
- Alwyn Young, economist

== Surname ==
- Joe Alwyn (born 1991), English actor
- Kenneth Alwyn (1925–2020), British conductor
- Nicholas Alwyn (born 1938), English cricketer
- William Alwyn (1905–1985), English composer, conductor, and music teacher
