= John Gorham =

John Gorham may refer to:

- John Gorham (graphic designer), British graphic designer
- John Gorham (military officer), New England Ranger
- John Gorham (physician), American physician and educator
- John Marshall Gorham, British motorboat racer
