= Treacher =

Treacher is an English surname; notable Treachers include:

- Arthur Treacher (1894–1975), English actor
- Bill Treacher (1930–2022), English actor
- George Treacher (c. 1835–1908), British architect
- Sir John Treacher (1924–2018), British admiral
- Sir William Treacher (1849–1919), British colonial administrator

== See also ==
- Arthur Treacher's, an American seafood restaurant chain
- Treacher–Collins syndrome, a genetic disorder
- Treacher Methodist Girls' School in Taiping, Malaysia
