= Catherine Street =

Street in Westminster, London, England

Coordinates: 51°30′44.54″N 0°7′11.49″W

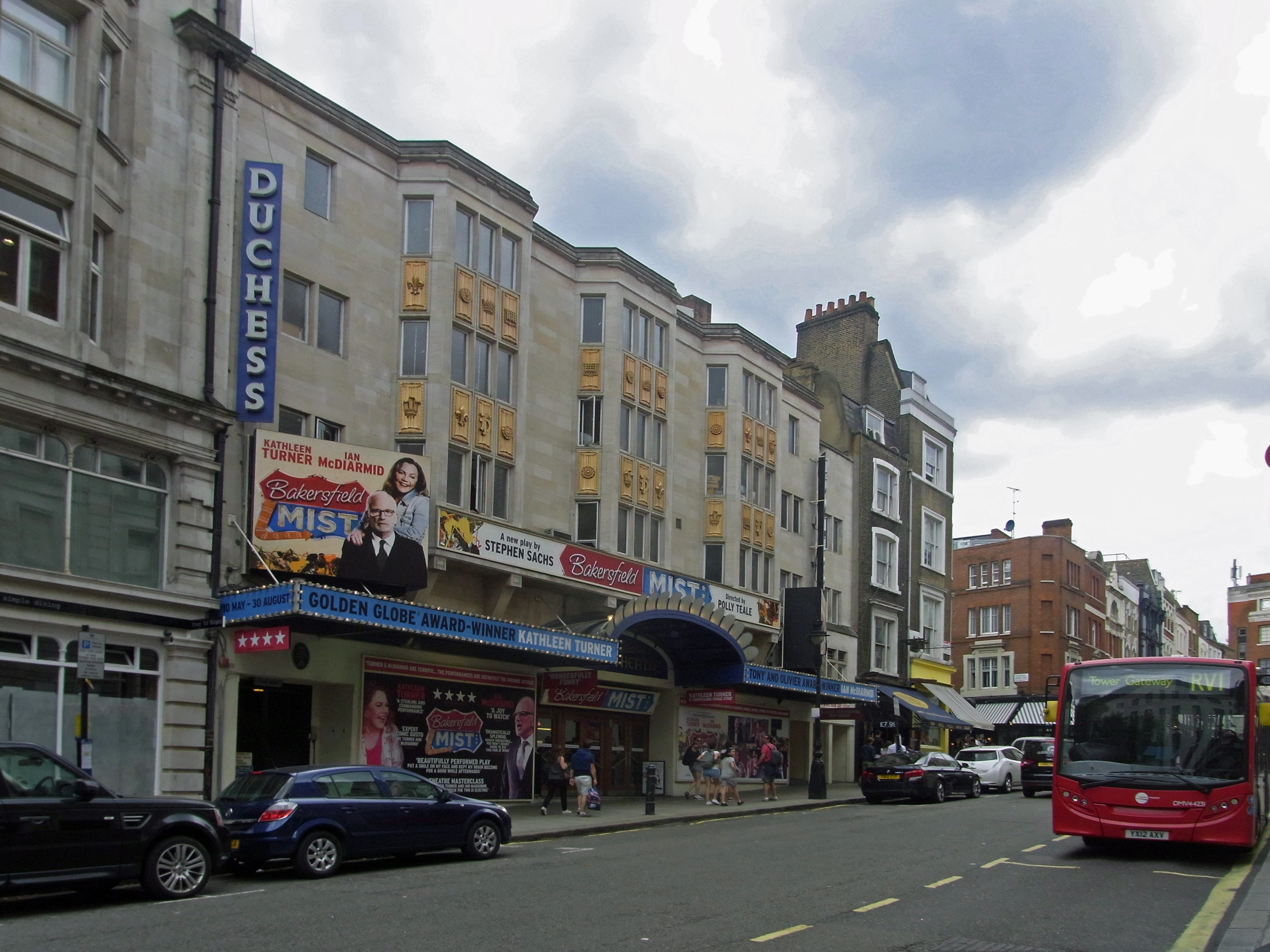
The Duchess Theatre in Catherine Street

Catherine Street, originally known as Brydges Street, is a street in the City of Westminster, London. It runs from Russell Street in the north to Aldwych in the south. It is crossed midway by Tavistock Street and joined on the western side near Aldwych by the eastern end of Exeter Street.

== History ==
The street was first laid out by Francis Russell, 4th Earl of Bedford, in the 1630s at which time it was closed at its southern end near the junction with Exeter Street. Its southern end was the wall of Exeter House garden and the back of the White Hart Inn in the Strand. The south part was named Catherine Street after Queen Catherine of Braganza, wife of King Charles II.

Until 1872 the north part was called Brydges Street after the fourth earl's wife. In that year the whole street was named Catherine Street.

== Buildings ==
The street is part of the theatre district of London's West End and includes the Theatre Royal Drury Lane on the corner with Russell Street, the Duchess Theatre on the west side and the Novello Theatre on the corner with Aldwych. All three theatres are listed buildings with Historic England, as are number 42 Tavistock Street on the corner with Catherine Street and number 15 Catherine Street.

The public houses in the street are Nell of Old Drury and the Opera Tavern, and there are a number of restaurants and bars. The Opera Tavern was built (with No 21) in 1879 to a design by the architect George Treacher.
