= The Yorkshire Grey =

Old name for public houses in England

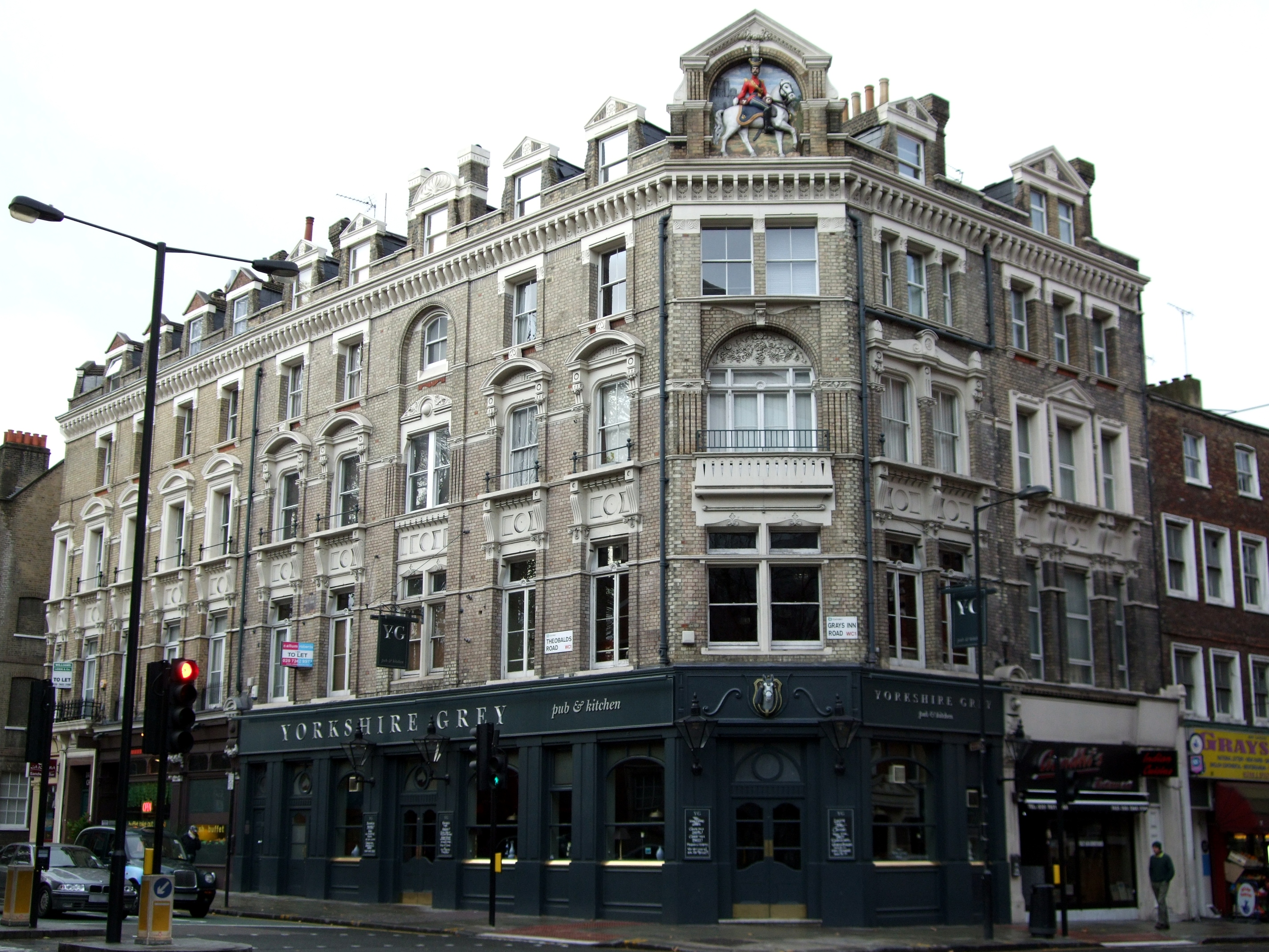
Yorkshire Grey in Camden, London

The Yorkshire Grey was a common name for public houses in England; some still survive but most have now closed or changed their name. They were named for the Yorkshire Grey Horse, a breed commonly used to pull brewery drays.

== Extant public houses ==
=== Biggleswade ===
140 London Road, Biggleswade

=== Camden, London ===
At the corner of Gray's Inn Road and Theobald's Road in Bloomsbury, Camden, London, situated to the north of Gray's Inn. It is a Grade II listed building, built in 1877 by J. W. Brooker. The pub was established in 1676 and was historically in the county of Middlesex. The Amalgamated Society of Gentleman's Servants once met at "The Yorkshire Grey" inn in the late 18th century, although Hart Street is mentioned as the location and it is possibly a different pub. In 1848 it was owned by an Oliver Waterloo King. It serves Scotch and Japanese whiskies and traditional English pub grub.

=== Doncaster ===
Located at 16–17 Hall Gate, Doncaster.

=== Earl's Croome, Worcestershire ===
Located on the A38, Earl's Croome. The Elgar Inn has been renamed to the original name of The Yorkshire Grey

=== Westminster, London ===
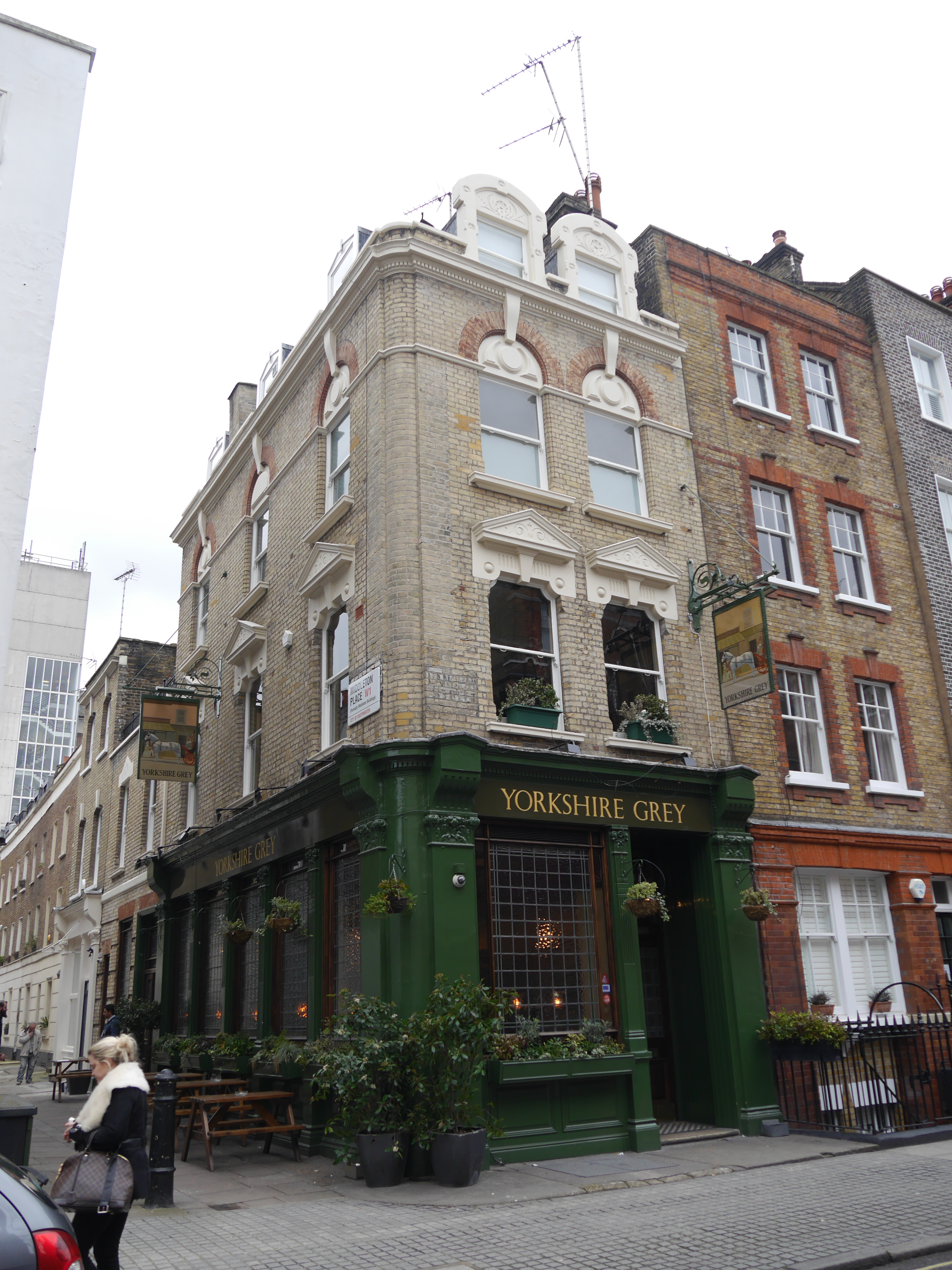
Yorkshire Grey, Langham Street, 2016

There is a Yorkshire Grey public house on the corner of Langham Street and Middleton Place in Fitzrovia/East Marylebone, City of Westminster, London W1 (51°31′8.23″N 0°8′28.91″W). The Yorkshire Grey dates back to at least 1826. It was rebuilt in 1882–83 to designs by the architect George Treacher.

The author and playwright J. B. Priestley was a regular visitor during the Second World War when he did his inspirational talks on BBC radio from the nearby Broadcasting House. The bandleader Billy Cotton was a frequent customer, as his radio programme was also broadcast from there.

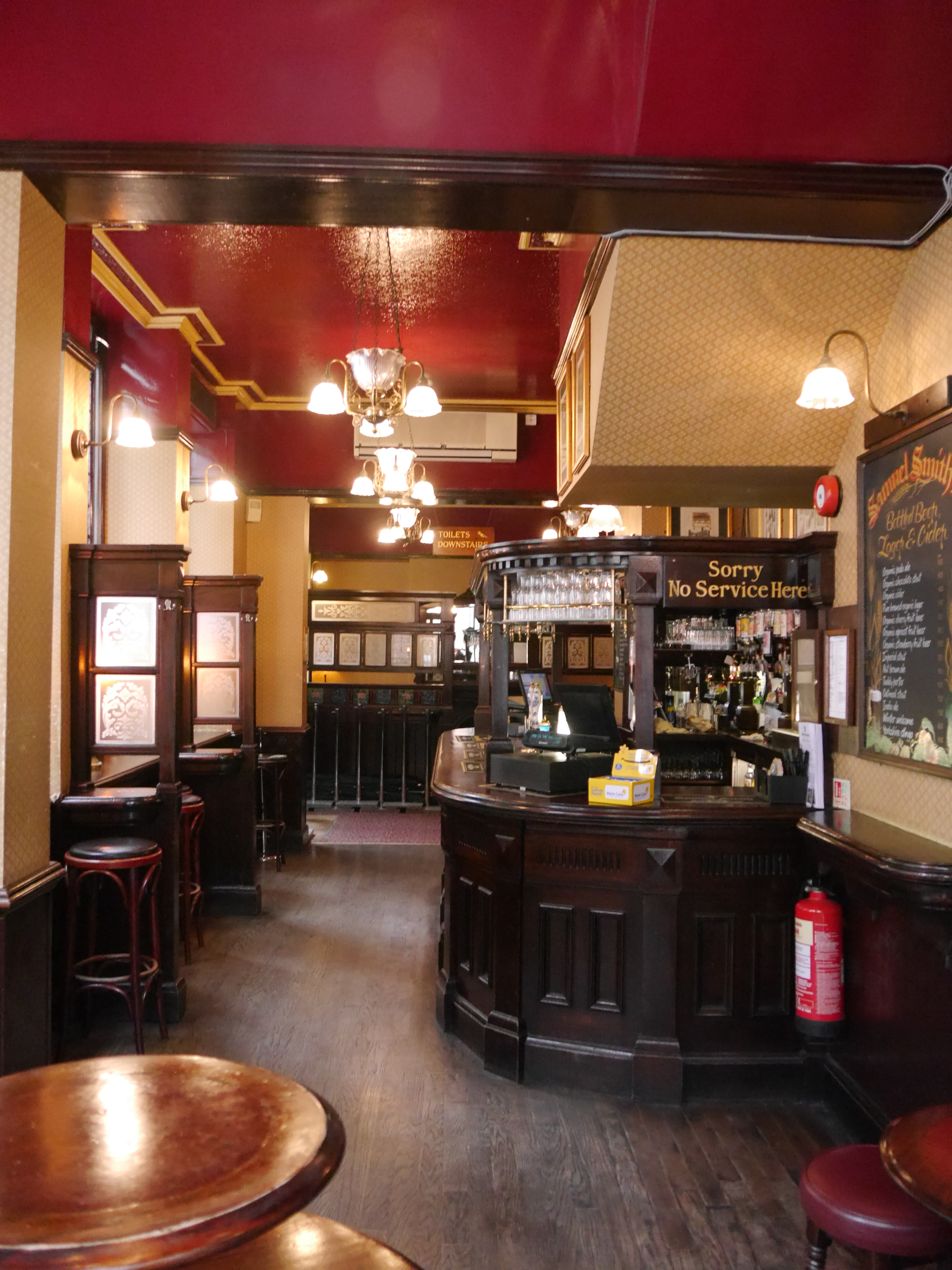
Interior view

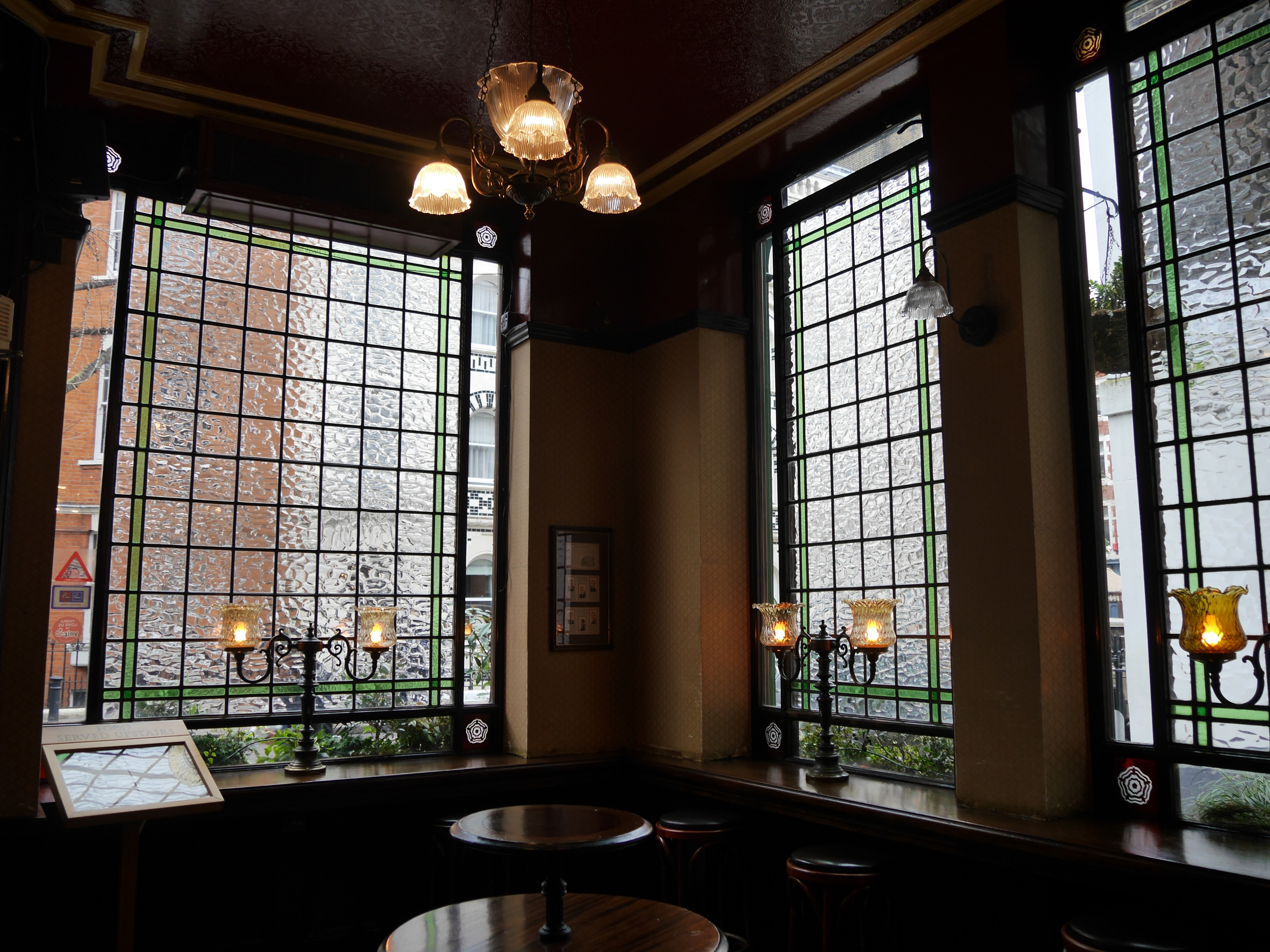
Leaded windows with stained glass inserts

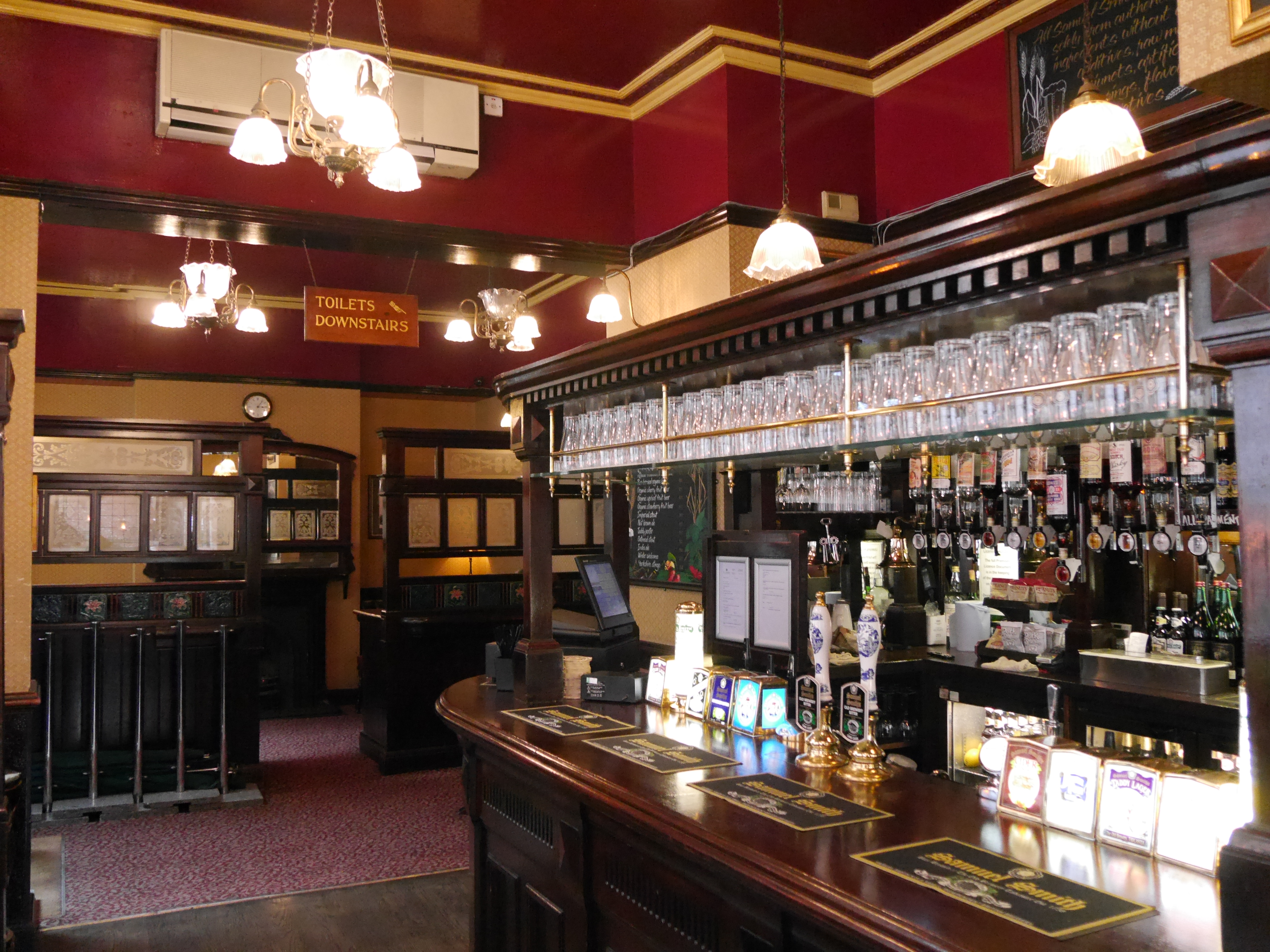
Bar

== Extinct public houses ==
Former public houses named The Yorkshire Grey
Location	Notes
Brentwood	Now a Giggling Squid restaurant at 33 High Street.
Cambridge	In the 19th century at 64 King Street
Coggeshall, Essex	Now a dental surgery.
Earl's Croome, Worcester	Renamed The Elgar Inn.
Eltham, London	Constructed in the 1920s on the Eltham Road (now South Circular) between Eltham and Lee. Closed in 1994 and became a McDonald's restaurant.
Portsmouth	Corner of Guildhall Walk and Alex Rose Ln. Grade II listed. Now the "Guildhall Village".
Sheffield	Built in 1833 at 69 Charles Street, Sheffield, closed in 2006 and later demolished.
Stevenage	Grade II listed building at 17 High Street. Now an ASK Italian restaurant.
Stratford, London	A Grade II listed building at 335–7 Stratford High Street. Also known as Spread Eagle and The Log Cabin. Closed in 2006 and now a hotel.
Winson Green, Birmingham	Now Lokman Sofrası, a Turkish restaurant.
