= List of sensory gardens =

A sensory garden is specially designed for the visually impaired. The following are locations where large public sensory gardens are available for persons who are interested in visiting and learning about them:

== Australia ==
- Gold Coast Regional Botanic Gardens

== Israel ==
- Katie Manson Sensory Garden, Jerusalem

== United States ==
=== Alabama ===
- Enabling Garden at the Birmingham Botanical Gardens

=== California ===
- Alice Keck Park Memorial Gardens

=== New York ===
- Mendon Ponds Park

=== Pennsylvania ===
- Wynnewood Valley Park Sensory Garden

=== Texas ===
- Riverside Nature Center

== Brazil ==
- Rio de Janeiro Botanical Garden

== Finland ==
- Finnish Museum of Natural History

== India ==
- Garden of Five Senses

== Italy ==
- Orto Botanico Comunale di Lucca

== New Zealand ==
- Auckland Domain

== United Kingdom ==
- Bury St Edmunds Abbey
- Birmingham Botanical Gardens
- High Hazels Park
