= Israel Elwyn =

Israeli nonprofit organization

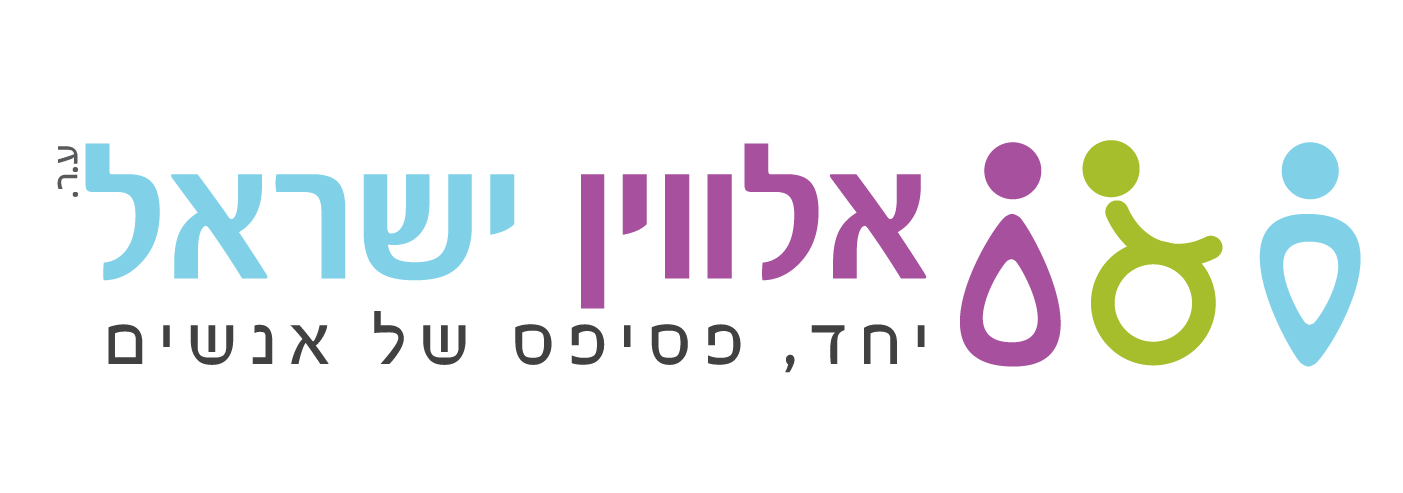
- Founded: 1984; 42 years ago
- Location: Jerusalem
- Region served: Israel
- Method: Education, Self-advocacy and Community services for the intellectually and developmentally disabled
- Key people: Alan Cohn (chairperson), David B. Marcu (CEO)
- Website: www.israelelwyn.org.il

Israel Elwyn (IE) (Hebrew: אלווין ישראל) is an Israeli nonprofit organization that provides services and programs for people with intellectual and developmental disabilities. It serves over 5,100 people from all age groups. The goal of the organization is to create a society in which people with disabilities have equal rights and can determine their own future and way of life. With the help of its programs, children and adults with disabilities gain the tools needed to lead more independent lives within the community.

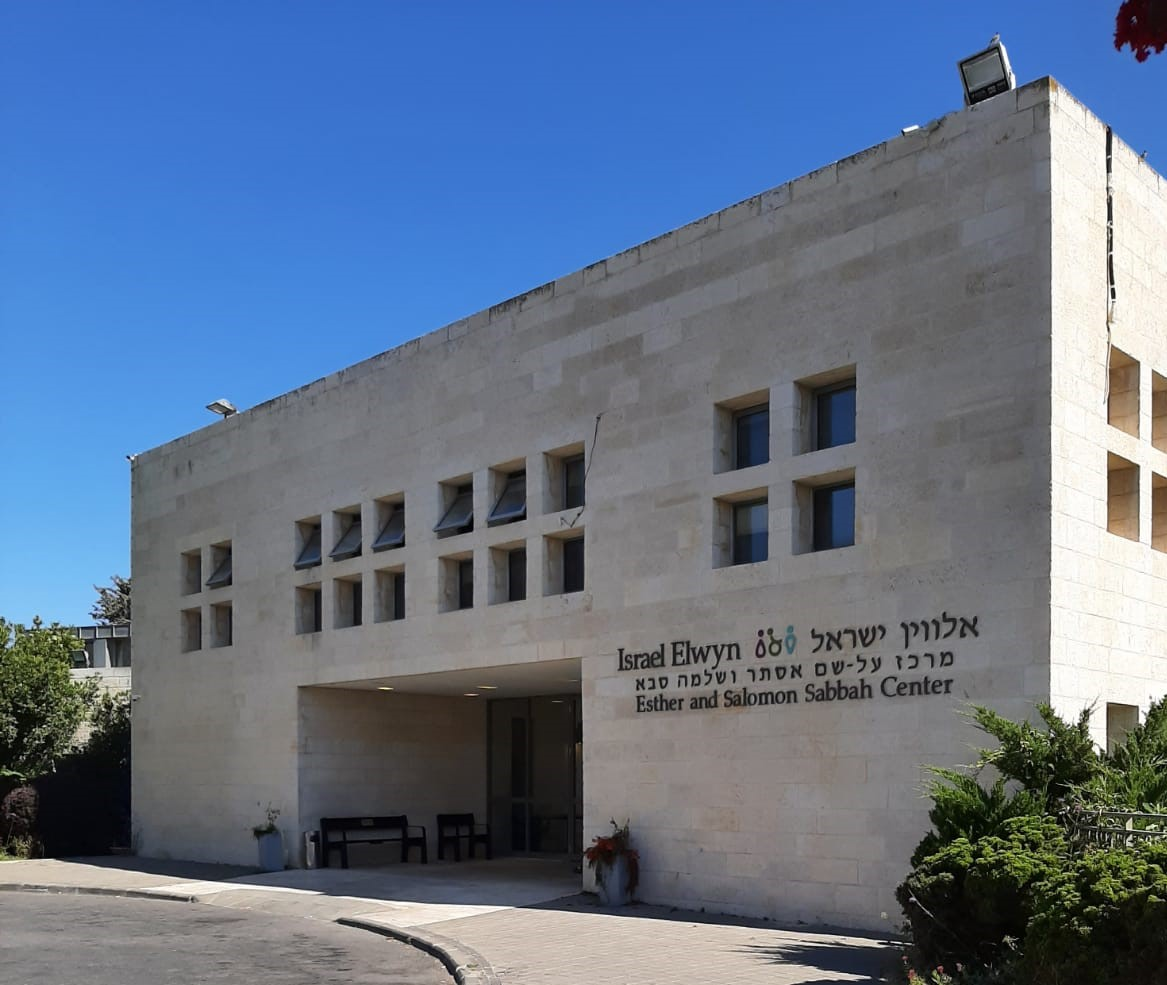
Israel Elwyn's Sabbah Center in Jerusalem

== History ==
Israel Elwyn was established in 1984 (as Jerusalem Elwyn; renamed to Israel Elwyn in 1998) as an offshoot of the American nonprofit Elwyn Inc., which was founded in 1852 and named for Alfred L. Elwyn. It was the first Elwyn affiliate outside the United States. The main offices of Israel Elwyn are located in Jerusalem.

In 1987, Jerusalem Elwyn inaugurated its first supported employment program for persons with intellectual and developmental disabilities, and two years later, added a program for individuals referred by the Rehabilitation Department of Bituah Leumi, the national social insurance company. In 1988 Kfar HaShvedi (the "Swedish Village"), a Malben-founded institution for children with disabilities, was transferred from the government to Jerusalem Elwyn.

In 1992, community living apartments were opened in Jerusalem and then other parts of Israel. By securing long-term leases, Elwyn provides people with disabilities with the possibility of living as part of the general community. Residents go out to work during the day and are able to maintain functioning households. Israel Elwyn also provides support for couples who wish to marry and live together independently.

A transitional program for high school students, 18+, was established in 1996 to prepare young people with disabilities for entering the work force. After the successful employment of a member of the community at a Jerusalem branch of Aroma Espresso Bar, the chain began to hire individuals with disabilities on a regular basis.

A program for retirees with disabilities at the Sabbah Center in Jerusalem in 2001 became a springboard for the Weinberg Retiree Center in Jerusalem's Kiryat Hayovel neighborhood. The center was established to meet the needs of formerly employed seniors with intellectual and other disabilities. It runs a social and cultural activities, as well as a coffee shop that is also open to the public.

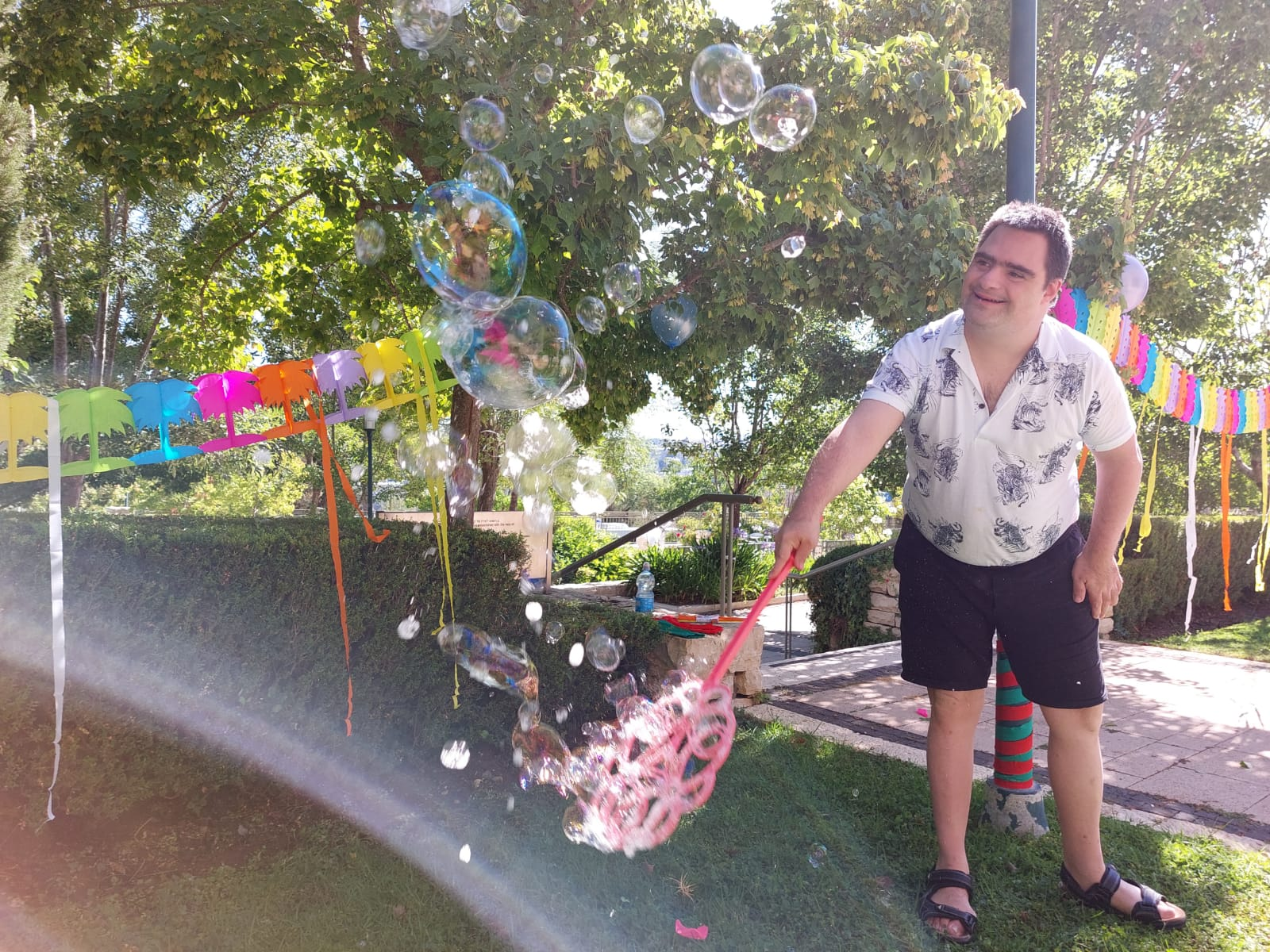
The Katie Manson's Sensory Garden, operated by Israel Elwyn in Jerusalem

In 2007, the organization inaugurated a sensory garden on its Jerusalem campus that encourages sensory stimulation and activities through the use of specially designed equipment. Katie Manson Garden has four sections, each dedicated to a different sense: touch, sight, hearing, and taste/scent. It was developed by the IDBruno-Industrial Design studio, and was jointly funded by the Manson family of Manchester, the Jerusalem Foundation and others.

In 2009, the organization launched Creating a Future, a program to prepare disabled students for inclusion in the competitive job market. Some 1,500 young people, aged 16–21, took part in the program in 2018–2019. It is run under contract with the Ministry of Labor, Social Affairs and Social Services and local municipalities. In 2020, the program was awarded the Zero Project prize.

In 2011, it established a self-advocacy program in cooperation with Beit Issie Shapiro to encourage people with intellectual and developmental disabilities to make their voices heard and advance their rights. Self-advocacy groups have since been formed all over the country. Each group appoints leaders and a recording secretary, and discussions are held on issues that affect individuals with disabilities in their daily lives: employment, how they are treated by those around them, accessibility of services and areas where change is needed.

In 2014, the Mosaic – National Service for All program was established for the inclusion of people with disabilities in Israel's national service program, Sherut Leumi. The Reshet program prepares teenagers with disabilities in the regular education system for independence through service in the Israel Defense Forces, Sherut Leumi and/or continuing education.

In 2016, the organization inaugurated a photography course for individuals with disabilities at its vocational center in Kfar Yona. Graduates of the course exhibited their work in a traveling show that was mounted at the Knesset, universities and community centers around the country.

In 2019, its "Volunteering for a Change" pilot program promoting volunteerism among teenagers with disabilities was awarded the Zero Project entrepreneurial prize. The ceremony was held at the UN building in Vienna. The program is a partnership between Israel Elwyn, the Ministry of Education, the Ministry of Labor, Social Affairs and Social Services, and the American Jewish Joint Distribution Committee in Israel. In one project, a community garden was planted and tended by teenagers with disabilities, who sold the produce and donated the money to the needy.

== Programs ==
Israel Elwyn operates early intervention centers; extended school day programs in kindergartens and special education schools; transitional programs for teenagers and young adults; support programs for young adults who volunteer for Sherut Leumi; training and employment in the competitive job market; adult day centers; retiree programs; supported living services; self-advocacy programs in the community; and cultural programs. In 2017, Haifa University offered a course in cooperation with Elwyn to train volunteers to assist the intellectually and development disabled in interactions with the authorities. Graduates of the course advise them on where to turn to exercise their rights, help them fill out applications and ensure follow up on their requests. In 2019, the Herzliya Interdisciplinary Center opened an academic program for individuals with disabilities that includes coursework and participation in campus life.Gordon College of Education in Haifa also runs a program in collaboration with Elwyn that trains members of the community as pre-school and kindergarten assistants. Another of its initiatives is a preparatory course for chefs' assistants which will qualify them to work in hotels and restaurants after graduation.

The Israel Self-Advocacy conference is held annually in Jerusalem. It is planned, organized and led by individuals with intellectual and development disabilities.

== Branches ==
Israel Elwyn operates branches in Haifa and northern Israel, the Sharon and central Israel, Jerusalem and southern Israel.

== Awards ==
- Zero Project Awardee 2023: Future Directions programme

== See also ==
- Disability rights in Israel
- List of disability organizations
- List of sensory gardens
- Nothing About Us Without Us
