= Alwyn Scott =

American journalist

Alwyn Scott is an American journalist. In 2010, he earned recognition as a Pulitzer Prize finalist for his outstanding editorial work on a series of articles investigating the shutdown and sale of Washington Mutual, the largest U.S. bank to fail, amidst the foreclosure crisis. Throughout his career, Scott has garnered numerous prestigious awards for both his writing and editing prowess, solidifying his reputation as a trailblazer in the realm of journalism.

Scott is managing editor of the Puget Sound Business Journal, a weekly newspaper based in Seattle, Washington. He was the business projects reporter for The Seattle Times, a news editor at The Wall Street Journal in Brussels, a news editor and bureau chief for Dow Jones Newswires in London and Bangkok and has written for numerous publications.

His work has focused on the economic and social effects of globalization and trade.
