= Alwyn Young =

Alwyn Young is a professor of economics and the Leili & Johannes Huth Fellow at the London School of Economics and Political Science (LSE). He held a named chair at the University of Chicago and was on the faculty at Boston University and the MIT Sloan School of Management before joining the LSE faculty. A graduate of Cornell University, he holds an MA in law and diplomacy and a PhD in international relations, both from the Fletcher School of Law and Diplomacy at Tufts University, and a PhD in economics from Columbia University. Young has taught courses in introductory economics at the LSE to first-year undergraduates, and topics in modern economic growth as a part of advanced macroeconomics course at postgraduate level.

Well known academic papers by Alwyn Young include The tyranny of numbers: confronting the statistical realities of the East Asian growth experience and A tale of two cities: factor accumulation and technical change in Hong Kong and Singapore.

Professor Young's most recent research has focussed on growth in the African continent as well as the impact of HIV-Aids on GDP figures

== Selected publications ==
- "The Gift of the Dying: The Tragedy of AIDS and the Welfare of Future African Generations". Quarterly Journal of Economics 120 (May 2005): 243–266. PDF. Appendix.
- "Gold into Base Metals: Productivity Growth in the People’s Republic of China during the Reform Period". Journal of Political Economy 111 (December 2003): 1220–1261.
- "The Razor’s Edge: Distortions and Incremental Reform in the People’s Republic of China". Quarterly Journal of Economics 115 (November 2000): 1091–1135. Data.
- “Growth without Scale Effects". Journal of Political Economy 106 (February 1998): 41–63. JSTOR.
- "The Tyranny of Numbers: Confronting the Statistical Realities of the East Asian Growth Experience". Quarterly Journal of Economics 110 (August 1995): 641–680. JSTOR.
- "Lessons from the East Asian NICs: A Contrarian View.” European Economic Review 38 (1994): 964–973.
- "Substitution and Complementarity in Endogenous Innovation.” Quarterly Journal of Economics 108 (August 1993): 775–807. JSTOR.
- "Invention and Bounded Learning by Doing". Journal of Political Economy 101 (June 1993): 443–472. JSTOR.
- "A Tale of Two Cities: Factor Accumulation and Technical Change in Hong Kong and Singapore". In NBER, Macroeconomics Annual 1992. Cambridge, MA: MIT Press, 1992. PDF.
- "Learning by Doing and the Dynamic Effects of International Trade". Quarterly Journal of Economics 106 (May 1991): 369–405. JSTOR.

== See also ==
- Exogenous growth model
