= Alfred L. Elwyn =

American physician, author and philanthropist

Alfred Langdon Elwyn
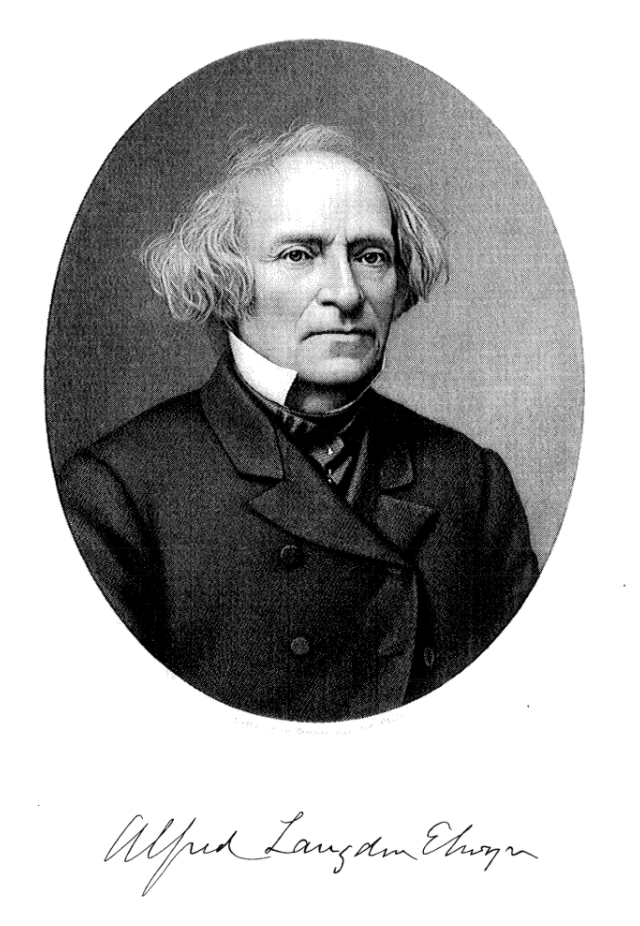
- Born: July 9, 1804; Portsmouth, New Hampshire, U.S.
- Died: March 15, 1884 (aged 79)
- Resting place: Laurel Hill Cemetery, Philadelphia, Pennsylvania, U.S.
- Occupations: Medical doctor, writer, pioneer in the education and care of the mentally disabled

Alfred Langdon Elwyn (9 July 1804 – 15 March 1884) was an American medical doctor, writer and philanthropist. He was a pioneer in the education and care of people with mental and physical disabilities. He was one of the founding officers of the Pennsylvania Institution for the Instruction of the Blind in 1833 and founded the Pennsylvania Training School for Feeble-Minded Children in 1852. The community of Elwyn, Pennsylvania and the Elwyn Institute are named in his honor.

== Early life and education ==
Elwyn was born in Portsmouth, New Hampshire, to Elizabeth Sherburne (née Langdon) and Thomas Elwyn. His grandfather was John Langdon, the 2nd governor of New Hampshire. Elwyn graduated from Exeter Academy in 1819 and Harvard University in 1823. He read medicine with Dr. John Gorham in Boston and in 1826 traveled to London, Edinburgh and Paris. He returned to the United States in 1829 and received his medical degree from the University of Pennsylvania in 1831 but never practiced medicine.

On January 31, 1832, he married Mary Middleton, daughter of James Mease and granddaughter of Pierce Butler of South Carolina. Together they had a son and daughter.

== Career ==
Elwyn was one of the founding officers of the Pennsylvania Institution for the Instruction of the Blind in 1833. He traveled to Boston for a meeting of the American Association for the Advancement of Science in 1849. He had promised to take a letter from Rachel Laird, a blind girl living in Philadelphia, to Laura Bridgman, who was a famous blind deaf mute in Boston. Bridgman was studying at the South Boston Institute for the Blind, and while there Elwyn visited a classroom for mentally disabled children run by teacher James Richards.

Elwyn was impressed with Richards' work, and resolved to do something similar in Pennsylvania. In 1852, with Richards, Elwyn established a training school for those with mental disabilities in Germantown, Pennsylvania. In 1853, the Pennsylvania State Legislature formally chartered "The Pennsylvania Training School for Feeble-Minded Children" with Richards as its first superintendent in Germantown. The institution was only the third of its kind in the United States. The school soon outgrew its facilities in Germantown, and in 1857 a 60-acre (240,000 m^{2}) farm was purchased in Media, Pennsylvania, to house a new facility with help from the Pennsylvania legislature. The buildings were completed in 1859 and Elwyn, Richards and 25 students moved in on September 1, 1859. The school was officially dedicated November 2, 1859 and industrialist John P. Crozer spoke at the ceremony. Elwyn became head of the school in 1870.

He was elected as a member of the American Philosophical Society in 1844. In 1850, Elwyn founded the Pennsylvania State Agricultural Society and Farmers' High School and served as president of a society for prevention of cruelty to animals. He served as treasurer of the American Association for the Advancement of Science between 1849 and 1870. He belonged to the Academy of Natural Sciences and was a director of Girard College.

He published several books including the poem Bonaparte, Glossary of Supposed Americanisms, Letters to the Hon. John Langdon, during and after the Revolution, Melancholy and its Musings and A Few Hints to the City on Intemperance.

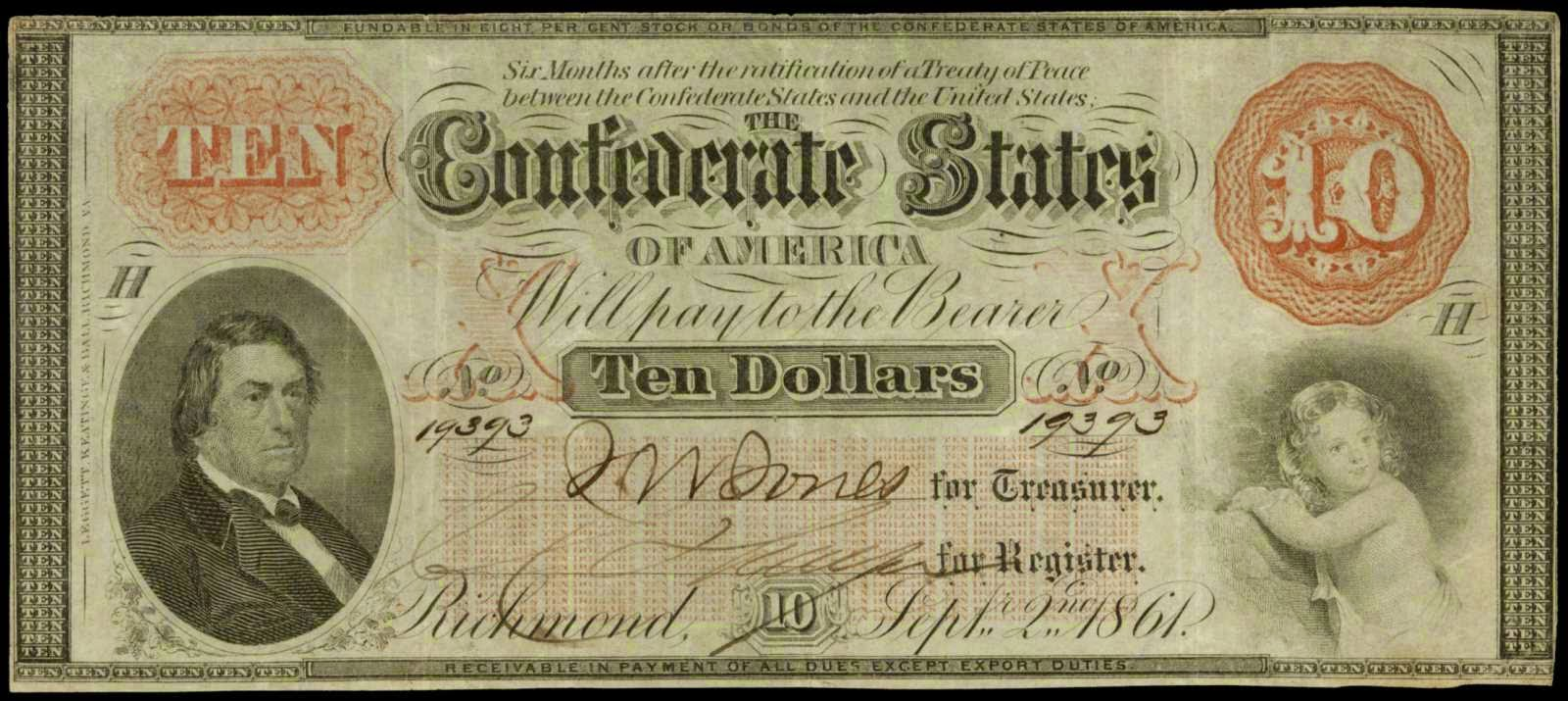
Confederate $10 Banknote with Elwyn's son depicted on the right.

Elwyn's son, also named Alfred Langdon Elwyn (born 1832), was as a child the subject of a portrait painted by Thomas Sully. The portrait was owned by Edward L. Carey and hung in the Academy of Fine Arts in Philadelphia. In 1862, the portrait was used on the ten dollar Confederate States banknote. The son had become an abolitionist as an adult, but his identity was unknown when the portrait was chosen.

== Death and legacy ==
He died on March 15, 1884, and was interred at Laurel Hill Cemetery in Philadelphia, Pennsylvania. The town of Elwyn, Pennsylvania, and the multistate chain of intellectually and developmentally disabled care facilities Elwyn, are named in his honor.

== Bibliography ==
- Bonaparte, Philadelphia, 1848
- Papers relating to public events in Massachusetts preceding the American revolution, 1856, T.K. and P.G. Collins, Philadelphia
- Glossary of supposed Americanisms, 1859, J.B. Lippincott & Co., Philadelphia
- Scenes from an Atheist's Life, 1871, J.B. Lippincott & Co., Philadelphia
- Letters to the Hon. John Langdon, during and after the Revolution, 1880
- Melancholy, and its Musings, 1881
- A Few Hints to the City on Intemperance.
