= Elwyn Jones =

Elwyn Jones may refer to:

- Sir Elwyn Jones (solicitor) (1904–1989), Welsh solicitor, town clerk of Bangor, and briefly a Labour MP
- Elwyn Jones, Baron Elwyn-Jones (1909–1989), Welsh barrister and politician
- Elwyn Jones (writer) (1923–1982), Welsh television writer and producer
- David Elwyn Jones (1945–2003), Welsh writer and politician
