= Elwyn, Pennsylvania =

Unincorporated community in Pennsylvania, US

- Unincorporated community
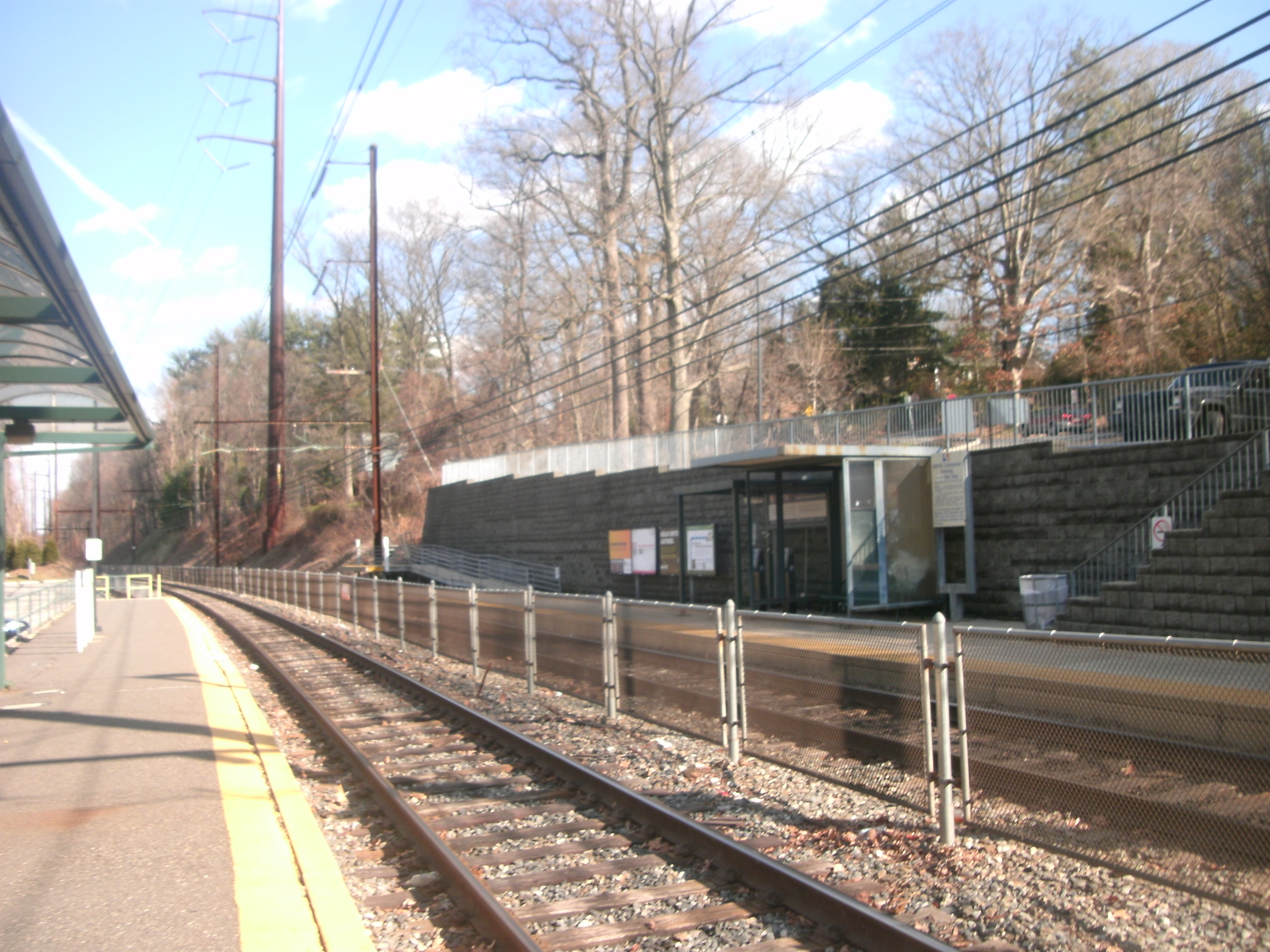
- Elwyn station

- Location within the U.S. state of Pennsylvania Elwyn (the United States)
- Coordinates: 39°54′28″N 75°24′37″W
- Country: United States
- State: Pennsylvania
- County: Delaware
- Township: Middletown
- Elevation: 253 ft (77 m)
- Time zone: UTC-5 (Eastern (EST))
  - Summer (DST): UTC-4 (EDT)
- ZIP code: 19063
- Area codes: 610 and 484

Elwyn is an unincorporated community located in Middletown Township, Delaware County, Pennsylvania, United States. Elwyn has a latitude of 39.907N, longitude of -75.41W and a mean elevation of 253 feet above sea level.

Elwyn is home to Elwyn Inc., a facility caring for the needs of the developmentally disabled and disadvantaged.

Elwyn is named for Dr. Alfred L. Elwyn, a physician who founded The Pennsylvania Training School for Feeble-minded Children in 1852 with teacher James B. Richards.

== See also ==
- Media Area
