= Elvina =

Elvina may refer to:

== Places ==
- Castro de Elviña, ruined site in Galicia, Spain
- Elviña, Spain, town where the Battle of Corunna took place during the Peninsular War
- Elvina, former name of the Ajax Copper Mine, now the Ajax Mine Fossil Reef, in South Australia
- Elvina Bay, New South Wales, bay in northern Sydney, Australia

== People ==
- Elvina Beck (born 1985), Russian entrepreneur
- Elvina Djaferova, Uzbekistani women's international footballer
- Elvina M. Hall (1818–1889), American songwriter
- Elvina Ibru, (born 1972), Nigerian actress
- Elvina Karimova (born 1994), Russian water polo player
- Elvina Kong (born 1967), Hong Kong actress
- Elvina Pallavicini (1914–2004), Italian noblewoman
- Elvina Ramella (1927–2007), Italian opera singer
- Elvina Vidot (born 1993), French paralympic athlete
