= Alwyn MacArchill =

Scottish noble

- Occupation: rannair to the King of Scots
- Employer(s): David I, King of Scots; Malcolm IV, King of Scots
- Spouse: Ede
- Children: Gilleandrais
- Parent: Arkil

Alwyn MacArchill (Note: Variously known in secondary sources as: Alwyn MacArchill, Alwin Macarchill, Aluin MacArkill, and Alfwin the rannair. Variously known in contemporary sources as: Alfuin filio Archil, Alfwin macarch, Alfwino filio Archil, Alfwino filio Archill, Aluuino Rennere, Alwino filio Archil, Alwino filio Archill, Alwino mac Archil, Alwyn mac Archil, Alwyn mac Arkil, Alwynus filius Arkil, Algune mac Archil, and Elwynus Renner.) was a mid-12th-century man who appears in numerous charters of the Kings of Scots. He, and his son, held the office of rannair—a distributor of the food and provisions—to the King of Scots. Over the years, some historians have suggested that he was an ancestor of the Earls of Lennox; some made him the first earl, others made him a male-line ancestor of the first earl, another suggestion is that he is an ancestor of the first earl in the female-line.

== Biography ==
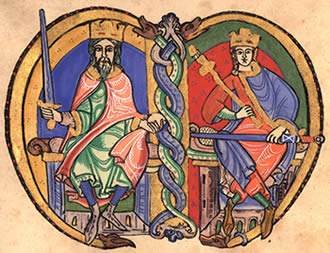
An old David I, and young Malcolm IV, illustrated in a mid-12th-century charter.

=== Various names ===
Alwyn MacArchill appears in numerous contemporary sources during the reigns of David I and Malcolm IV. Historian G. W. S. Barrow noted that nineteen acts of David I were witnessed by Alwyn MacArchill. The 20th-century linguist Kenneth Hurlstone Jackson noted numerous sources and stated that his name appears four times as Alfwin; once as Alfwin; six times as Alwyn; and once as Algune (in the Book of Deer). Jackson stated that his father's name is recorded as: Arkil three times; Archill three times; Archil thirteen times; Arcill once (in the Book of Deer); and Arch- once. Jackson noted that his father's name, Arkil, an Old Danish name; and that the name Alfwin represents the Old English name Ælfwine, although in England the name appears to have been borrowed into Old Danish as early as the 11th century.

=== Ancestry ===
It has been suggested that Alwyn's father may have been a Northumbrian noble. Jackson, however, disagreed with this proposal. He believed that the evidence of the names showed that he was of Anglo-Danish descent. Jackson noted that there is a charter in the reign of David I which mentions a man named Arkil who had lands between Haddington and Athelstaneford. If this man was the father of Alwyn, it would mean Alwyn had East Lothian connections.

=== Life ===
In one contemporary record his wife, Ede, is recorded. Barrow stated that he was in turn succeeded by his son, Gilleandrais the rannair. Barrow stated that Alwyn MacArchill was probably the man portrayed by Ailred of Rievaulx's biographer Walter Daniel, as "the jealous and foul-mouthed caluminator of Ailread who nevertheless repented of his hostility, became Ailread's friend, and was consequently promoted by the king. Barrow noted how Daniel wrote that Ailread stood at the king's table as chief steward, and served the dishes and divided the food for those present; Barrow stated that this would have been precisely the duties of Alfwin the rannair (the Gaelic rannair, means "sharer", "divider", i.e. 'the distributor of the food and provisions'). Barrow noted that Sir Maurice Powicke thought that Ailread's enemy was Walter, son of Alan.

== Ancestor of the Earls of Lennox? ==
Arms of the mediaeval Earls of Lennox.

=== In the male-line ===
It has been thought that the Earls of Lennox were descendants in the male line, of Alwyn MacArchill, and his father Archill. The 19th-century historian William Forbes Skene stated that this theory was first produced in 1716, by George Crawfurd. According to Sir James Balfour Paul, the theory of this descent was later elaborated by Sir Robert Douglas, and further expanded by Sir William Fraser. The theory was that Alwyn I, Earl of Lennox was identical to the Alwyn MacArchill, who appears as a witness on numerous charters of David I, down to at least the year 1154. This man's father was thought to have been Archillus, son of Aykfrith; and to have been a Northumbrian magnate, who was an exile of William the Conqueror. It was thought that this Archill/Archillus went to Scotland in 1070, where he received lands in the Lennox. Skene, however, stated that there was nothing to support this theory, other than the similarity in names. Alwyn MacArchill never appears in records with a title of earl; and that he does not appear in records after the year 1155, yet Alwyn I first appears in record in 1193. Between 1155 and 1193, Skene stated, the earldom of Lennox was in the possession of David, Earl of Huntingdon. Also, Paul noted that the mediaeval English chronicler Simeon of Durham only notes that Archill was made an exile; he does not mention him passing into Scotland.

Paul also noted another theory, which made the earls "Celtic" in the male line. This made Alwyn I, the son of Muireadhach, who was possibly a Mormaer of Lennox himself. For example, the 13th-century bard Muireadhach Albanach, employed for some time by the Lennox family, wrote a poem which outlined their ancestry which included Muireadhach. Paul followed this theory in his The Scots Peerage. This poem takes the male line ancestors of Alwyn I back several generations, According to Jackson, the genealogy is probably only reliable as far back as Muireadhach's father, Maol-Domhnaigh.

William Buchanan of Auchmar also stated that Alwyn MacArchill was the ancestor of the earls, yet gave him a different ancestry. Buchanan stated that "Aluin MacArkill" was "a great favourite at court" during the reigns of David I and Malcolm IV. He was the son of Arkill, a contemporary of the Scots kings Edgar and Alexander I, and a person of note during their reigns. Buchanan stated that Arkill was the son of "Aluin, or Alcuin", a younger son of Kenneth III.

=== In the female-line ===
It has also been suggested that Alwyn MacArchill is an ancestor of the Earls of Lennox in the female line. The first Earl of Lennox on record had Gaelic name Alúin, Ailín. Muireadhach Albanach's poem states that his mother (who is unnamed) was the daughter of an Ailín. The chronology could allow that this man could be Alwyn MacArchill. This could mean that the first earl's name could have been the Old English/Old Danish name assimilated into Gaelic.
