= George Treacher =

Victorian architect in the UK

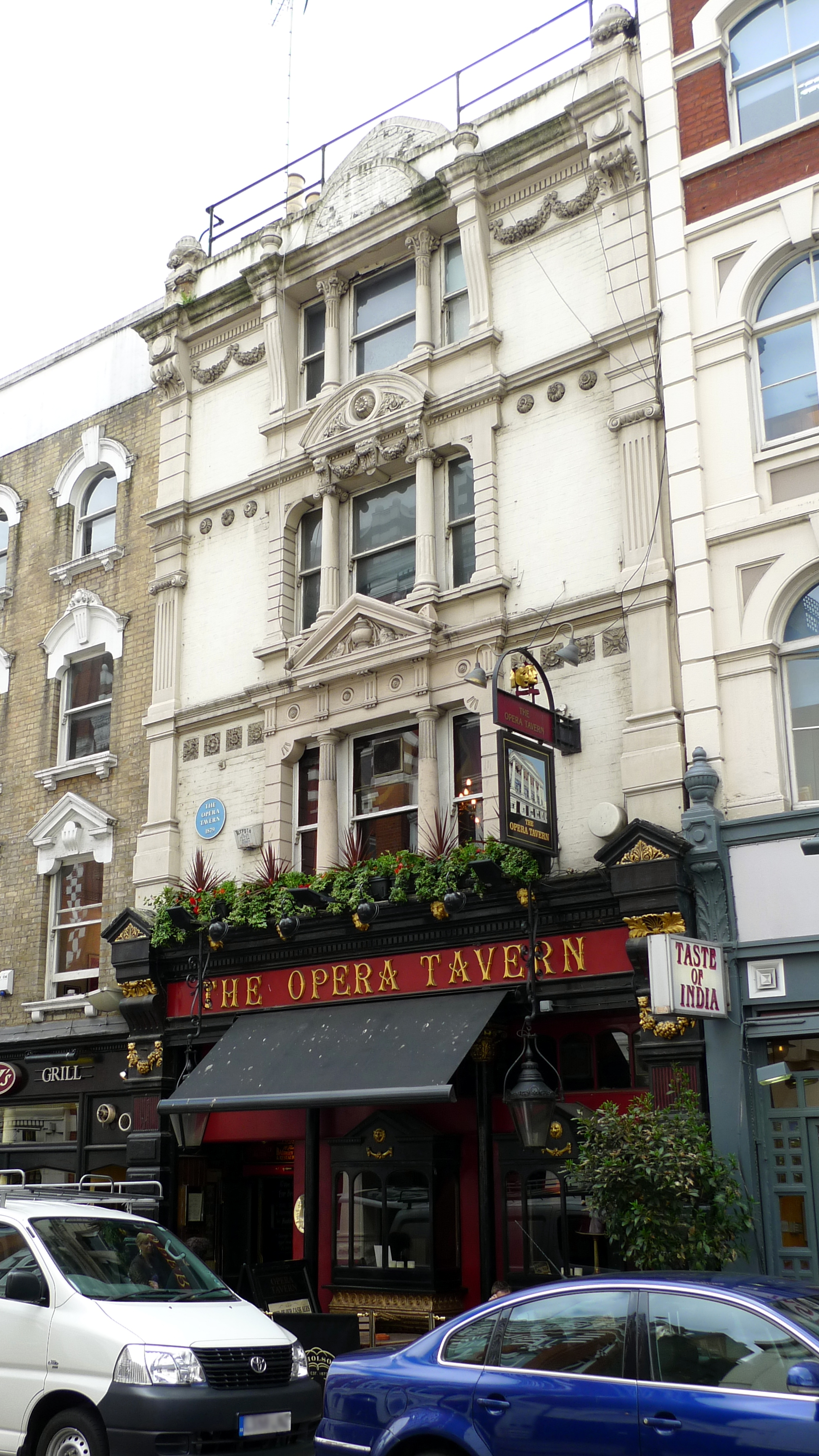
The Opera Tavern, Catherine Street.

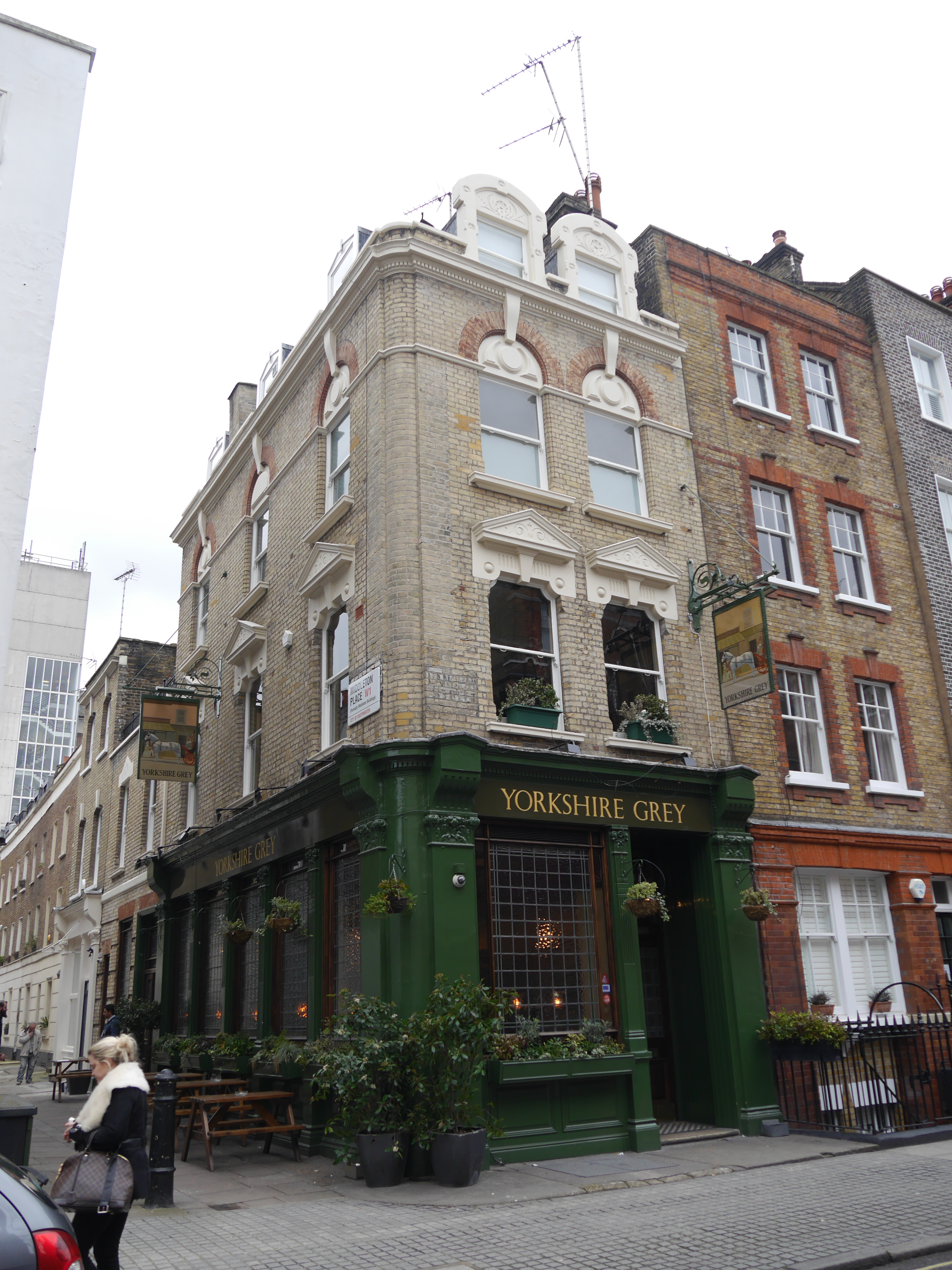
The Yorkshire Grey, Langham Street.

George Treacher (c.1835 – 28 February 1908) was a Victorian architect known for his pub designs.

== Early life and family ==
George Treacher was born around 1835 in Clapham, Surrey. He married Emma and had at least three daughters and two sons with her.

== Career ==
Treacher practiced as an architect and surveyor. He was particularity known for his designs for public houses which included The Opera Tavern (1879) in Catherine Street, London. He also designed the Britannia Public House (1881) at 45 Peckham High Street which has since been converted to a shop and the front lost, and the Yorkshire Grey on the corner of Langham Street and Middleton Place, rebuilt in 1882–3 to designs by Treacher.

== Death ==
Treacher died on 28 February 1908 at 68 Loughborough Park, Brixton. He left effects valued at £867.
