= Cleveland Bay =

Breed of horse that originated in England

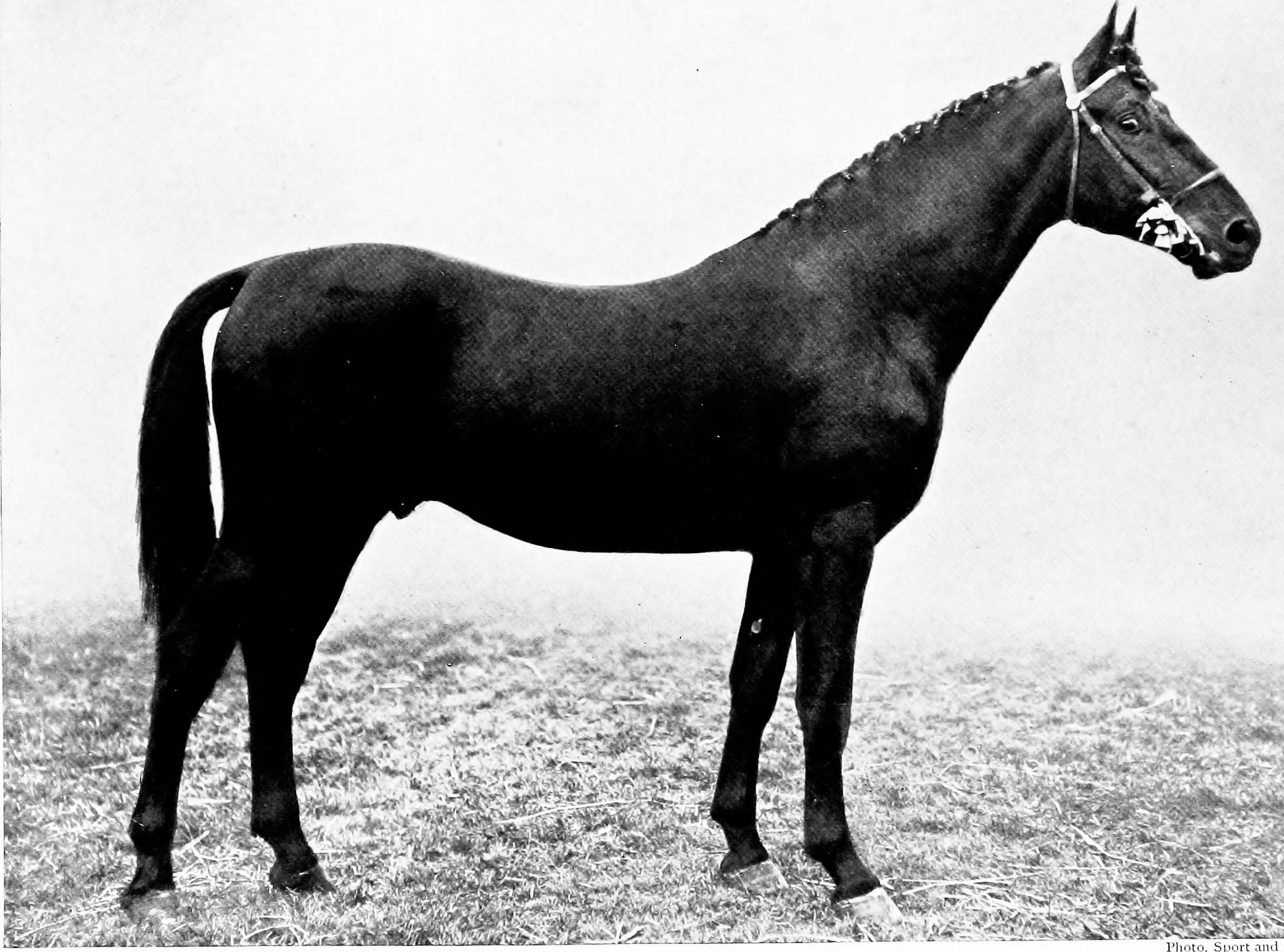
- Cleveland Bay, 1908

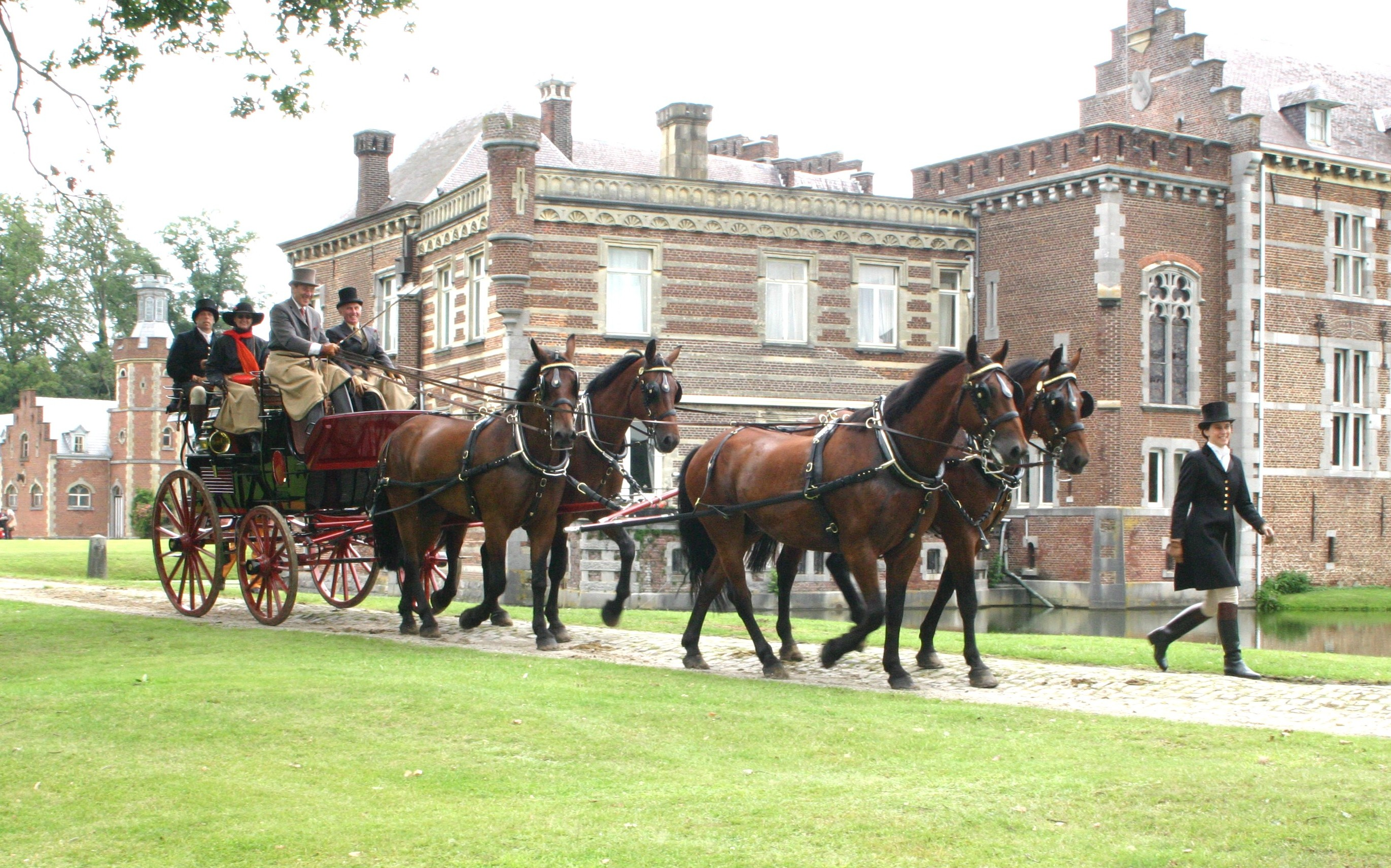
- Cleveland Bays in harness
- Country of origin: England

Traits
- Distinguishing features: Bay in colour, well-muscled, used mainly for driving

Breed standards
- Cleveland Bay Horse Society (UK); Cleveland Bay Horse Society of North America

The Cleveland Bay is a breed of horse that originated in England during the 17th century, named after its colouring and the Cleveland district of Yorkshire. It is a well-muscled horse, with legs that are strong but short in relation to the body. The horses are always bay in colour, although a few light hairs in the mane and tail are characteristic of some breed lines. It is the oldest established horse breed in England. The ancestors of the breed were developed during the Middle Ages for use as pack horses, when they gained their nickname of "Chapman Horses". These pack horses were cross-bred with Andalusian and Barb blood, and later with Arabians and Thoroughbreds, to create the Cleveland Bay of today. Over the years, the breed became lighter in frame as they were employed more as carriage and riding horses. The popularity of the Cleveland Bay has greatly fluctuated since it was first imported to the United States in the early nineteenth century. Despite serious declines in the population after the Second World War, the breed has experienced a resurgence in popularity since the 1970s, although only around 550 horses existed worldwide as of 2006.

They have been patronized by members of the British royal family throughout their history, and they are still used to pull carriages in royal processions today. The breed has also been used to develop and improve several warmblood and draught horse breeds. Today they are used for farm work and driving, as well as under-saddle work. They are particularly popular for fox hunting and show jumping, both pure blooded and when crossed with Thoroughbreds. The Cleveland Bay is a rare breed, and both the United Kingdom–based Rare Breeds Survival Trust and the United States–based Livestock Conservancy consider the population to be at critical limits for extinction.

== Characteristics ==
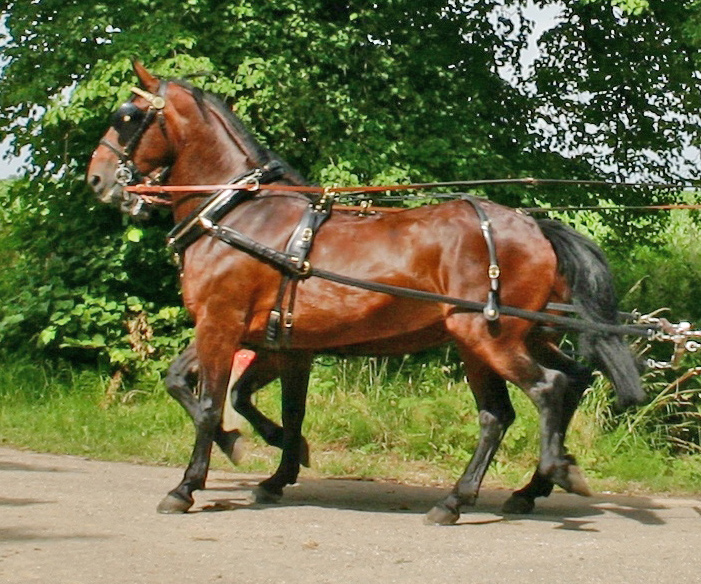
Cleveland Bays

The Cleveland Bay generally stands between 16 and 16.2 hands (64 and 66 inches, 163 and 168 cm), and is always bay in colour. Bright bay horses (bays with a more reddish tint than normal) are the most preferred by breeders, followed by ordinary bay, dark bay and then light bay. This preference for brighter shades of bay was originally stated in the official breed standard, although this stipulation has since been removed. In some bloodlines of the breed, light, grayish hairs in the mane and tail are known as a characteristic of pure blood. White markings, except for a small star on the forehead, render the horse inadmissible to the stud book. Horses are expected to have complete black points, including completely black lower legs. Legs that are red below the knees and hocks are considered faulty in colour, although they do not disqualify a horse from registration.

The occasional red legs that appear in the breed are thought to come from chestnut Thoroughbred stallions that were crossed into Cleveland Bay and Yorkshire Coach Horse bloodlines at some points in the history of both breeds. The uniformity in colour is encouraged as it makes creating matching driving teams and pairs very easy. When the breed was first developed, the horses almost always had a countershaded dorsal stripe, but these disappeared with the outcrossings of the 18th century.

The breed has a large head, slightly convex profile, and a long, well-muscled neck. The withers are well muscled, which often makes them less pronounced, the chest is broad and deep, the shoulders are muscular and sloping, and the croup slightly sloping. The legs are short in relation to the body, but strong and well muscled. The legs have little or no feather, as the breed was developed partially for working in the heavy clay soils of its native country, where heavy feather led to increased disease prevalence. They are hardy and long-lived horses, and docile in temperament. In the early twentieth century, when a breed standard was issued by the British Cleveland Bay Society for use in judging shows, a section was added on the movement of the horses, describing the desired action, especially at the trot. This was included in part because military potential was still considered a factor in evaluating harness horses and a good trot was necessary for an artillery horse. It was also evaluated because breeds with large action at the trot often also have a potential for jumping. The combination of desired characteristics means that the breed is useful for breeding show jumpers, eventers and steeplechasers (the latter especially when crossed with Thoroughbreds).

Part-bred horses can be registered under certain conditions. A horse with at least one grandparent may be registered in the UK stud-book. The Australasian society refers to part-breds as Sporthorses; they require at least 25% Cleveland Bay blood.

== Uses ==
The Cleveland Bay is a versatile horse and is still used today for many tasks, including driving and farmwork. The horses are used as heavy hunters, as they are powerful and able to carry a man weighing 250 pounds (110 kg) for a full day of hunting over large obstacles and through heavy clay. When crossed with Thoroughbreds, the resulting progeny are lighter and faster, but still strong and heavy of bone. When show jumping was first beginning as a sport during the mid-nineteenth century, Cleveland Bays were among the initial stars. Two mares, Star and Fanny Drape, were two of the top performers. Fanny Drape was known to have cleared a 6-foot (1.8 m) stone wall with a rider on her back, and a 7.5-foot (2.3 m) bar while being jumped in-hand. In 2006, a Cleveland Bay stallion named Tregoyd Journeyman was used as a model for a new horse figure by Breyer Animal Creations, and the stallion participated in that year's Breyer model horse festival.

== British royal horses ==
In the 1920s, Cleveland Bays replaced black Hanoverian horses in the British royal stables. Of the two types of carriage horses at the Royal Mews, the Windsor Greys pull carriages of senior royal family members, and the Cleveland Bays pull dignitaries and do other work. Post is driven daily between Buckingham Palace and St James's Palace with two Bays pulling a Clarence Brougham. Purebred and crossbred Cleveland Bays make up the majority of the bay horses in the Royal Mews, the British royal stables, where they receive intense training to desensitize them before they are put to work drawing royal carriages. The King's Troop, Royal Horse Artillery predominantly use bay-colored horses of several breeds; those pulling the limbers and caissons are frequently Cleveland Bays. Prince Philip, Duke of Edinburgh, used the breed during the 1970s and 1980s in combined driving competitions, borrowing horses from the Royal Mews and returning them for state duties.

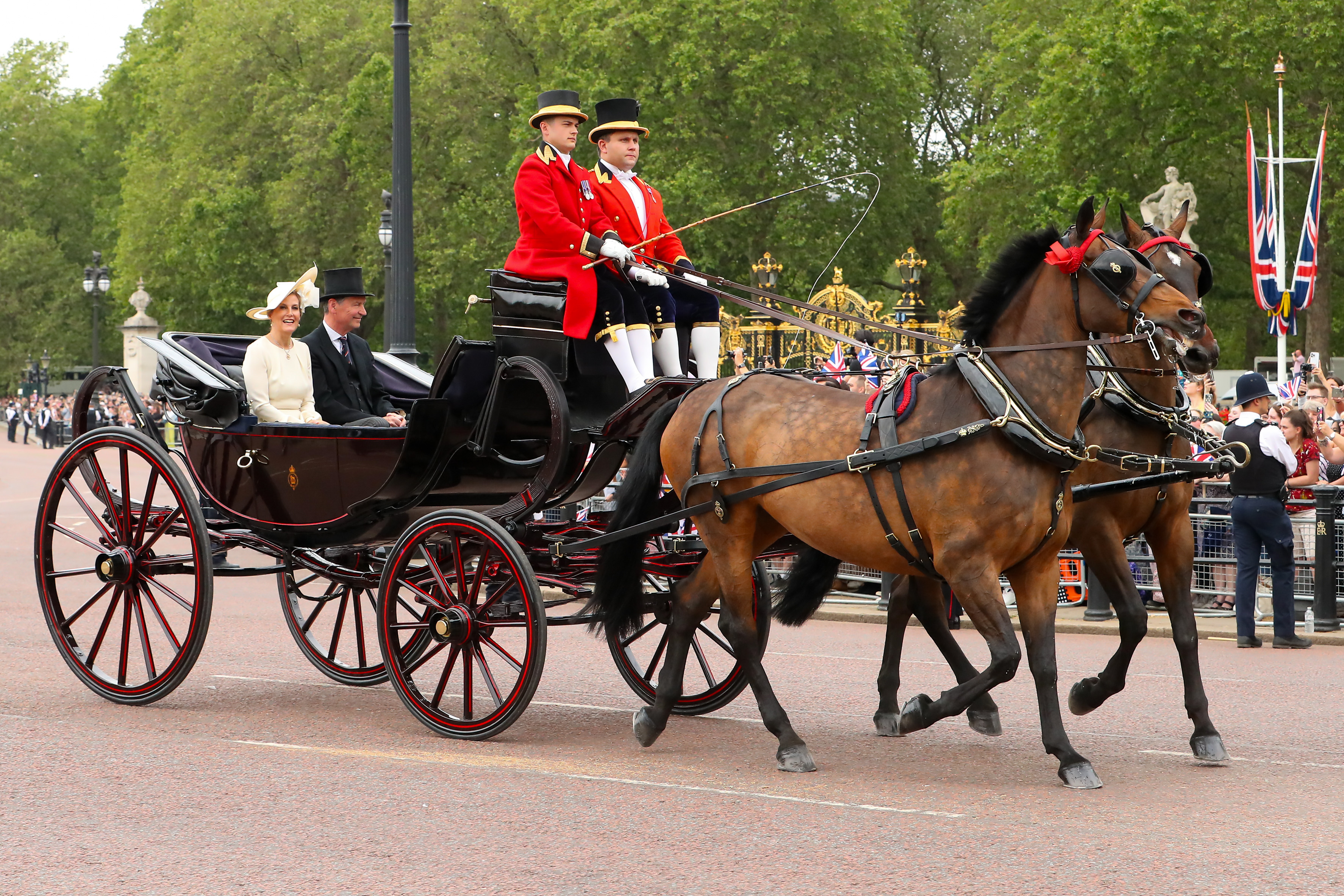
Trooping the Colour parade (2023)

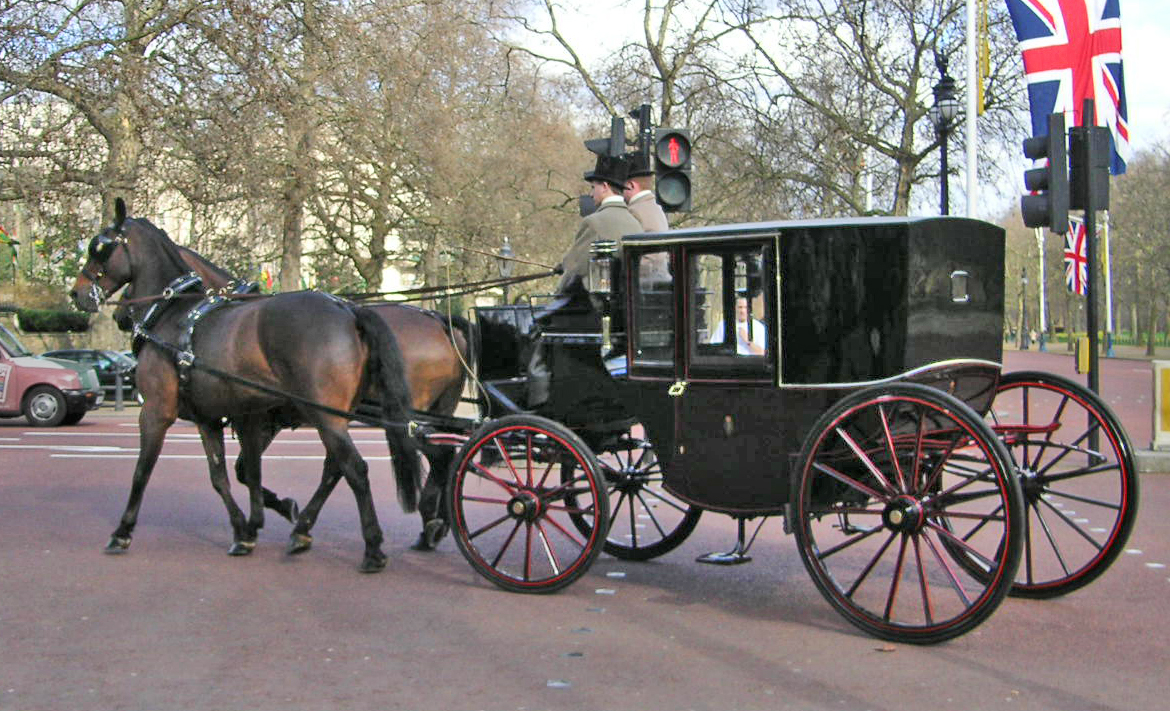
The messengers delivering post between palaces

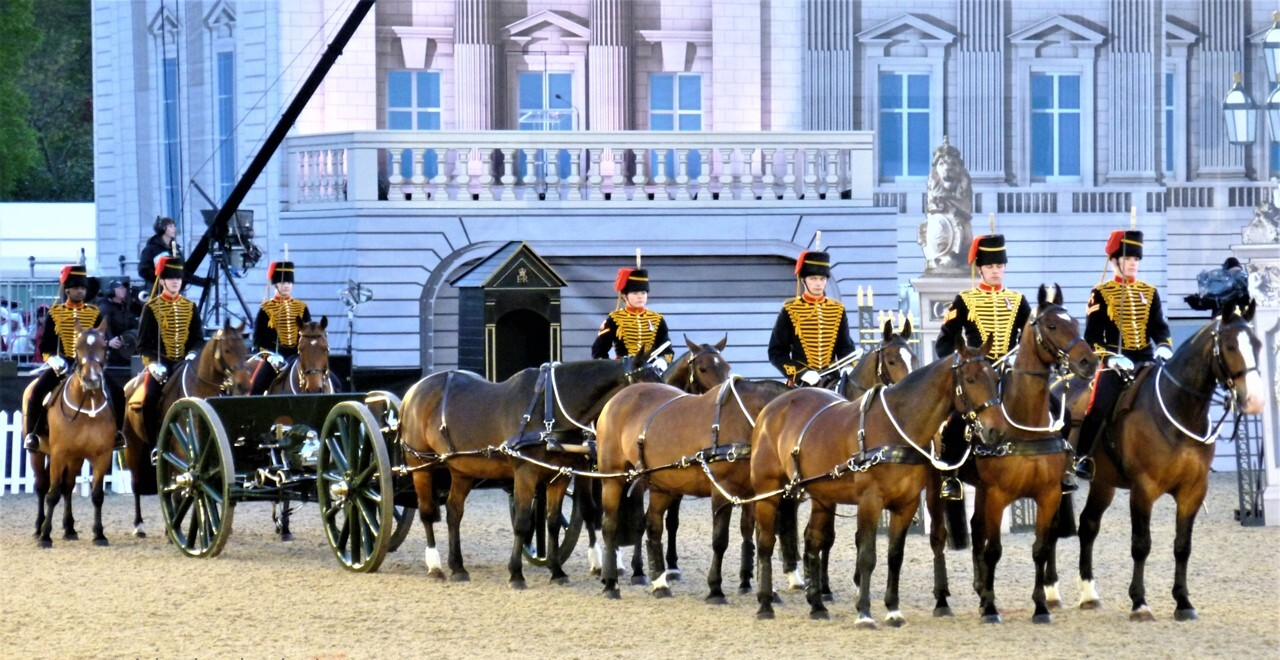
Bays of the King's Troop Royal Horse Artillery

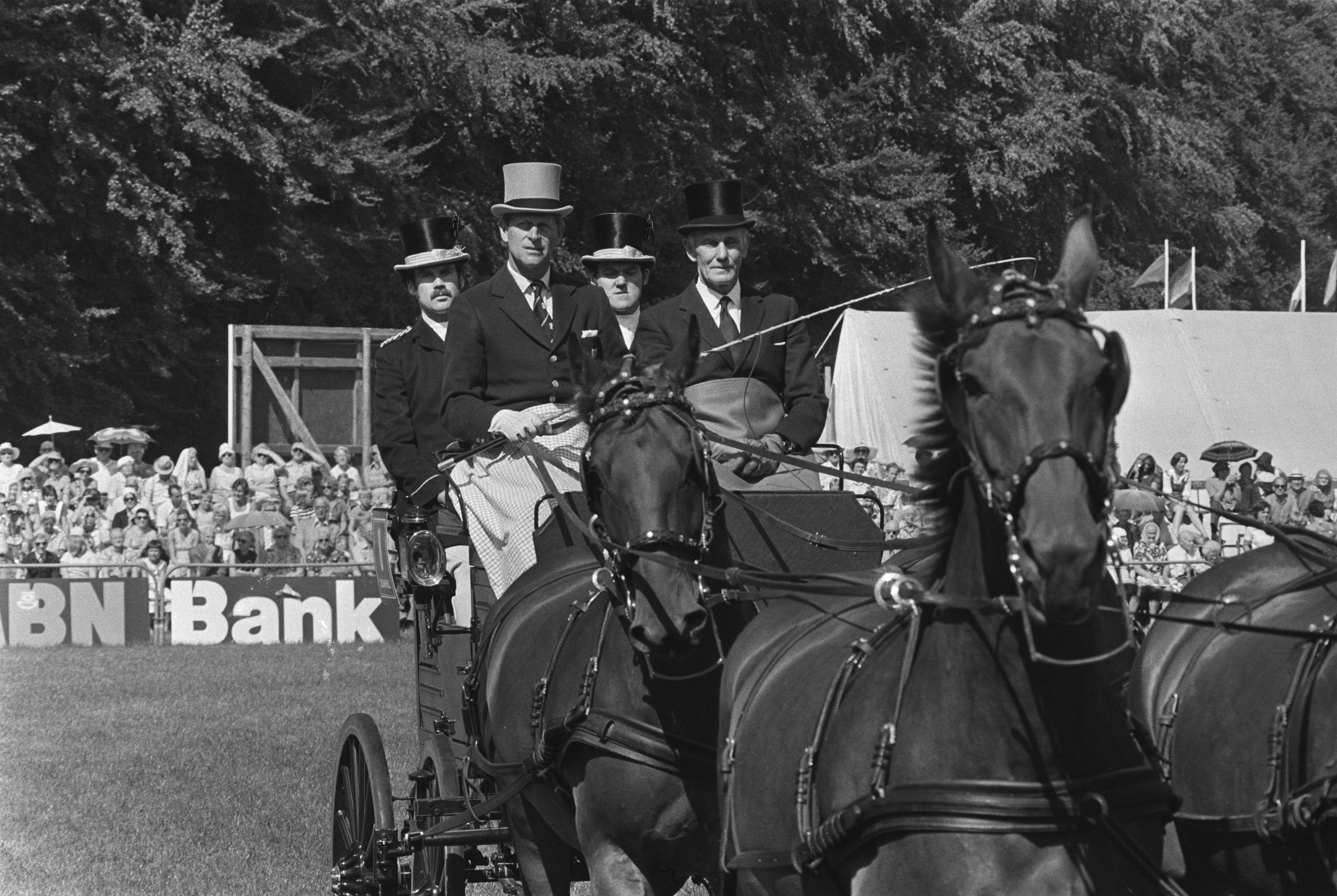
Duke of Edinburgh driving a four-in-hand of Cleveland Bays in a competition (Note: 1976 FEI Driving World Championship for Four-in-Hand Het Loo Palace in The Netherlands FEI.org)

== History ==
Developed in the Cleveland area of Yorkshire, England, the Cleveland Bay is said to be the oldest of the established English horse breeds, and the only horse native to Britain that does not belong to the heavy horse group. The closest breed in type is the Irish Draught, which shares common ancestors with the Cleveland Bay.

=== Development ===
The earliest breeding of the ancestors of the Cleveland Bay was done in large part by English churches and monasteries, to meet a need for pack horses to carry trade goods between abbeys and monasteries in northeast England. These medieval horses gained the nickname of "Chapman Horses" because of their use by itinerant dealers known as "chapmen". What is now the Cleveland Bay is thought to have been developed from Barb, Iberian, and Andalusian horses crossed with Chapman Horse mares. The Barb blood came mainly from horses imported by wealthy young men on their Grand Tour of Europe, bought off the docks in Marseille, France, and transported back to England.

The Andalusian or Iberian blood came from horses bred at the royal stud in Córdoba, Spain, and gifted to English royals, such as King Henry VIII, by the King of Spain. The stallions were often available for breeding to local horses, and the first infusion of Iberian blood was added to the native Chapman Horses. The Iberian horses also made their way to the outlying estates of English nobility, and were then taken by Oliver Cromwell's men after the English Civil War. Once in the hands of Cromwell's men, many of the stallions were made available for locals to cross with the existing Chapman Horses, adding a second infusion of Iberian bloodlines. In the late 17th century, a second infusion of Barb blood was added when Cleveland breeders purchased horses directly from soldiers at Tangier, or from the Moors themselves.

Between 1685 and 1785, it is believed that this early Chapman Horse/Andalusian/Barb type served as the foundation stock for the Cleveland Bay. During this century the type grew bigger due to better feeding, and by 1785, had developed through selective breeding into the "agricultural type" Cleveland Bay. This original type was heavier and more draught-like than the breed of today. This was due to a need for strength more than speed on the farms and poor roads of 17th- and 18th-century England. As roads improved, and speed became more important in the late 18th century, Thoroughbred and Arabian blood may have been added. The resulting horses were used extensively as coach horses, and were lighter of frame, with a well-arched neck and powerful shoulders, making for a flashy carriage horse.

Thoroughbred blood is believed to have been added by some scholars, in spite the claims of breeders that the Cleveland Bay was "free from taint of black or blood", meaning either Thoroughbred "blood" or the Old English "Black" and its descendants. The addition of Thoroughbred breeding is thought responsible for Cleveland Bays born with red legs (as opposed to the black normally associated with bay horses), generally the result of a chestnut Thoroughbred sire in the family tree.

A 2019 genetic study of the Cleveland Bay breed also revealed genetic similarities to the now-extinct Turkoman horse, the Connemara Pony, and the Irish Draught. A separate 2020 study also found that three of the maternal lines in the modern-day Cleveland Bay likely originated from Iberian or Barb mares.

=== Establishment ===
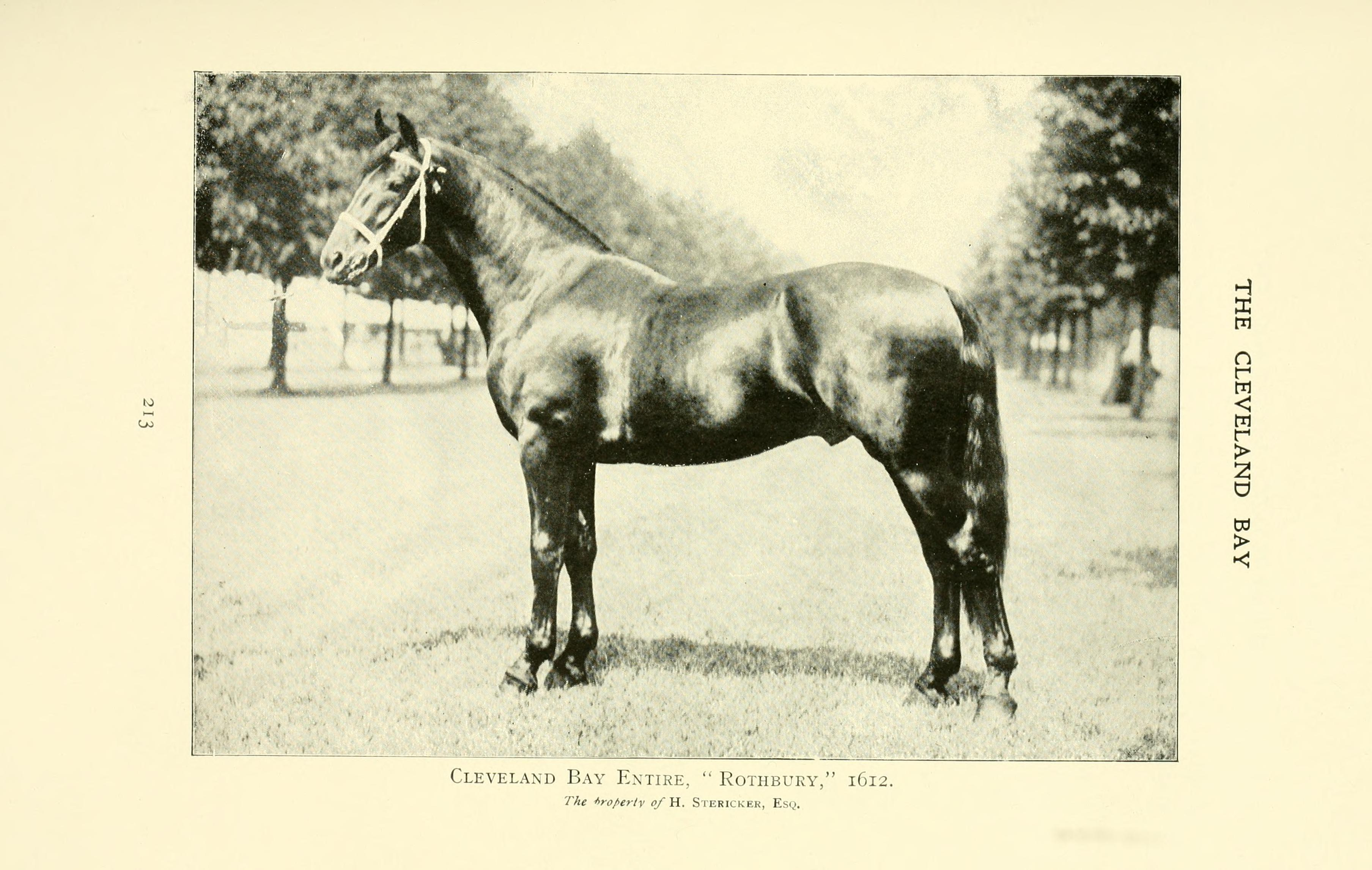
Stallion "Rothbury"

The British Cleveland Bay Horse Society was formed in 1883, and the first stud book was published in 1884. The 19th century saw the export of many Cleveland Bays overseas to Australia, New Zealand, South Africa, the United States, India, Russia, France, Germany, and the European continent. In the early 19th century, Cleveland Bays were first imported to Maryland, Virginia, and Massachusetts in the United States, and in 1884 the Upperville Colt & Horse Show was created in Virginia by Colonel Richard Henry Dulany to showcase his imported Cleveland Bay stallion and the offspring of the stallion. The Cleveland Bay Society of America was formed in 1885, and by 1907 over 2,000 horses were registered in the studbook. The stud book began publication in 1889, although horses were registered who had lived as far back as 1860. Judging from the descriptions of the earliest registered horses, it is possible that many of the "Cleveland Bays" registered were actually Yorkshire Coach Horses; however, all were registered as Clevelands, and that is what they are known as today. Over 2,000 horses were registered with the association by 1907. The horses were of interest to Buffalo Bill Cody, who drove four Cleveland Bay stallions in his Wild West Show.

Before the First World War, having seen the horse cavalry feats of mounted Boers during the Second Boer War, Britain increased its cavalry reserves. Smaller Cleveland Bays were used to carry British troopers, and larger ones pulled artillery; the War Office offered premiums on Cleveland Bay stallions. Although the First World War was not the cavalry war that had been expected, large numbers of horses were used to pull artillery and losses were high. Because the war caused a depletion in stock, in 1920 and 1921, the British society opened a special register for previously unregistered mares of Cleveland Bay type, including some already registered as Yorkshire Coach Horses, subject to inspection. Foals of these mares were eligible for registration in the main stud-book, and were also eligible to compete in breed competitions. Some were bred and owned by King George V.

=== Decline and re-emergence ===
However, interest in the Cleveland Bay was waning, due to increased mechanisation, and the Great Depression of the early 1930s reduced exports by almost a third. There was a brief revival of interest in the late 1930s in the United States when Alexander Mackay-Smith imported some as foundation stock for hunters. The decline continued, quickening after the Second World War; in 1960, the War Office stopped offering premiums on stallions, and many breeders discontinued breeding.

By 1962, only four purebred stallions were present in the United Kingdom. Queen Elizabeth II saved the breed by purchasing Mulgrave Supreme, a stallion that was about to be sold to a buyer in the United States. The stallion was bred to pure- and part-bred mares, and within 15 years, there were 36 purebred stallions in the UK. Elizabeth II was a patron of the Society from 1977, and during the Society's centenary year of 1984 she acted as its president.

In the late 1960s and 1970s, interest in the breed increased, and part-bred Cleveland Bays were in demand for use as riding horses, especially for use as hunters and jumpers. In 1964, a Cleveland Bay/Thoroughbred cross competed in show jumping in the Tokyo Olympics. Another half-bred Cleveland Bay competed for the British Olympic team in show jumping at the 1968 Mexico City Olympics, while a third was a reserve mount for the Canadian show jumping team at the 1976 Montreal Olympics. In the late 1960s and '70s, horses continued to be exported to many countries. Japan, the United States, and Australia have continued to import the horses from England; and, in New Zealand, crosses between Cleveland Bay stallions and native mares were in demand on cattle and sheep stations.

The Cleveland Bay Horse Society keeps a separate register for part-bred horses. In the late 20th century, the breed again gained the attention of the United States public, and in 1985, the U.S. association was reactivated, renamed "The Cleveland Bay Society of North America". In the US, The Livestock Conservancy considers their status to be critical, which means there is an estimated global population of less than 500, and fewer than 200 annual registrations in the United States. The UK Rare Breeds Survival Trust also considers their status to be critical, with less than 300 breeding females registered worldwide. The Equus Survival Trust also considers the breed population to be at critical levels, meaning there are between 100 and 300 breeding females left in the world. About 135 purebred horses are registered in the United States and Canada. There are also small populations in Japan, New Zealand, and Australia. In 2006, an estimated 550 Cleveland Bay horses existed worldwide, of which about 220 were mares; the 2005 foal crop produced fewer than 50 horses. Paul Bennett, the director of the Coach and Livestock Department for Colonial Williamsburg, estimated the global population of purebred Cleveland Bays to be around 1,000 in 2020, with 220 being in North America, including the United States and Canada. However, infertility in mares was an ongoing issue.

A 2020 study revealed inbreeding to be another issue in the Cleveland Bay breed, with genetic analysis revealing that approximately 91% of the stallion and 48% of the dam lines no longer existed in the modern breed, partly due to loss of genetic diversity through crossbreeding from 1900 to 2006. The study also found that "only 3 ancestors determine 50% of the genome in the living population, with 70% of maternal lineage being derived from 3 founder females, and all paternal lineages traced back to a single founder stallion".

According to the Cleveland Bay Horse Society of North America (CBHSNA), in 2023, there were only 27 purebred foals born in North America, but this represented an 145% increase from previous breeding seasons from 2013 to 2022. According to the group, there were 758 horses of Cleveland Bay ancestry alive in North America as of June 2024, with 238 (32.4%) being purebreds, and 520 (68.6%) being partbreds. Pennsylvania and Michigan in the United States and Canada were noted as Cleveland Bay breeding hubs.

== Influence on other breeds ==
In the late 18th century, the Cleveland Bay was used to create the Yorkshire Coach Horse by crossing with Thoroughbreds. The Cleveland Bay was used in the creation of the Oldenburg breed in Germany, because of its stamina, strength, and jumping ability. The breed was also used to create and improve the Holstein and Hanoverian breeds, as well as other German warmbloods, and the Selle Français in France. In the 19th century, the Cleveland Bay was also crossed with the Clydesdale, Percheron, and Suffolk Punch breeds to create the foundation stock for the Vladimir Heavy Draft, a new draught breed developed by Russia to fill that country's need for a heavy draught breed. The Vladimir Heavy Draft was officially recognized as its own breed in 1946.

=== Yorkshire Coach Horse ===
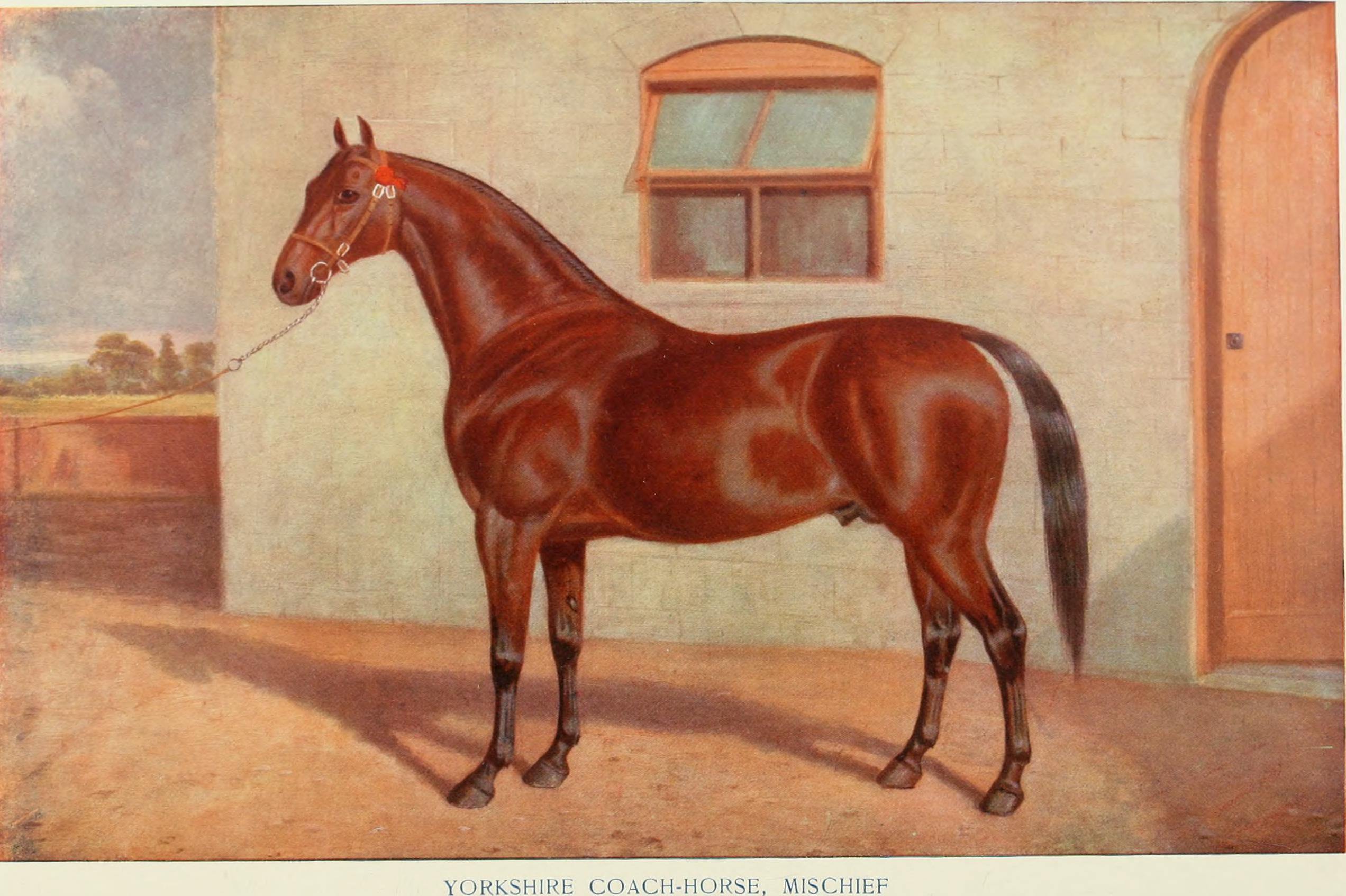
Yorkshire Coach Horse (1906)

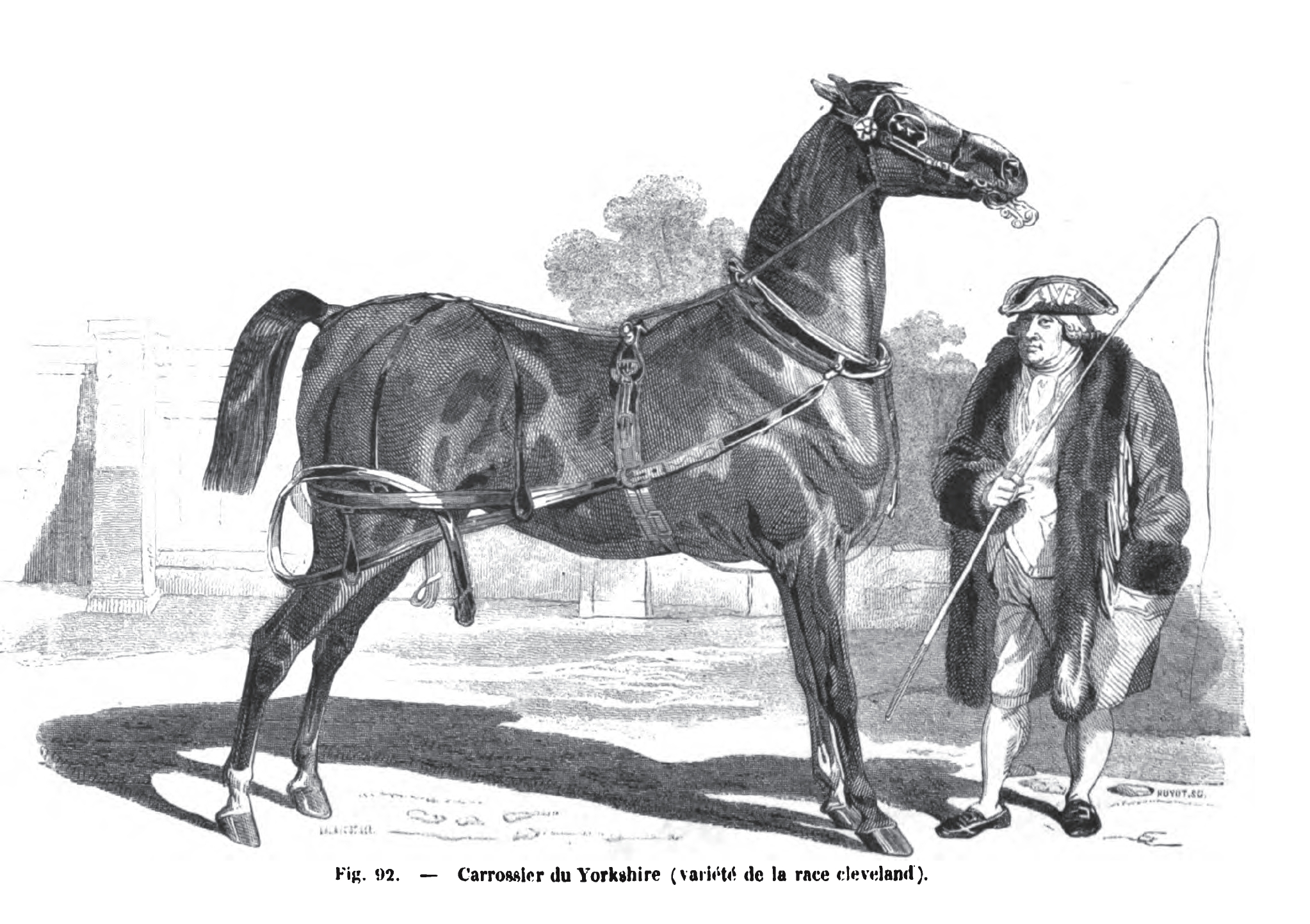
Yorkshire Coach Horse (1861)

The Yorkshire Coach Horse is an extinct horse breed or type that was created by crossing the stronger and stockier Cleveland Bay with Thoroughbreds to make a faster carriage horse when the quality of roads improved in England.

The horse closely resembled the Cleveland Bay, though was taller, with finer head and bone, and colored bay or brown. In 1905, J. Wortley Axe wrote, "In most of their essential properties, however, the Cleveland Bay and the Yorkshire Coach-horse are very closely allied, the two varieties representing the best type of heavy coachers we possess". Called by some the "New Cleveland Bay", foreigners often could not distinguish between the two breeds, and many horses registered as Cleveland Bays in European coach horse studbooks were actually Yorkshire Coach Horses.

There has been some debate over whether or not the Yorkshire Coach Horse constituted an actual breed or was just a type as its epoch was relatively short-lived, breeders primarily used first and second-generation Thoroughbred and Cleveland Bay crosses, and many found the Yorkshire Coach Horse to be indistinguishable from the Cleveland Bay. In North America, Yorkshire Coach Horses were registered under the Cleveland Bay stud book and usually called Cleveland Bays. In 1886 England, a Yorkshire Coach Horse Stud Book was started, which contained horses that were three-quarters Cleveland Bay and one-quarter Thoroughbred. The stud book was closed in 1936 as extinct.

According to Chris Berry of The Yorkshire Post, "The late 18th century was the golden age of carriage driving. Yorkshire coach horses were exported all over the world to provide matched pairs and teams. During the height of the London season hundreds of pairs of Yorkshire coach horses could be seen in Hyde Park every afternoon."

== Sources ==
- Bongianni, Maurizio, ed. (1988). Simon & Schuster's Guide to Horses and Ponies. New York, New York: Simon & Schuster, Inc. ISBN 0-671-66068-3. OL 2396660M.
- Dent, Anthony (1978). Cleveland Bay Horses. Canaan, New York: J.A. Allen. ISBN 0-85131-283-7.
- Edwards, Elwyn Hartley (1994). The Encyclopedia of the Horse (1st American ed.). New York, New York: Dorling Kindersley. ISBN 1-56458-614-6.
- Edwards, Elwyn Hartley; Geddes, Candida, eds. (1987). The Complete Horse Book. North Pomfret, Vermont: Trafalgar Square, Inc. ISBN 0-943955-00-9. OL 2409784M.
- Hayes, M. Horace (1976) [1969]. Points of the Horse (7th Revised ed.). New York, New York: Arco Publishing Company, Inc. ISBN 978-0-09-038711-3.
- Hendricks, Bonnie (1995). International Encyclopedia of Horse Breeds. University of Oklahoma Press. ISBN 0-8061-2753-8. OL 1279627M.
