= Elwyn Hartley Edwards =

British horse writer and judge (1927–2007)

- Born: 17 April 1927
- Died: 9 December 2007 (aged 80)
- Occupations: Equestrian writer and judge
- Awards: Military Cross; Award of Merit (BHS, 1993)

Elwyn Hartley Edwards, MC, (1927–2007) was a British equestrian judge, editor and prolific writer.

== Career ==
Captain Elwyn Hartley Edwards served in the British Army for 13 years as a Gurkha officer in India and Malaya, and was awarded the Military Cross. He was later posted as an instructor of military history at the Indian Military Academy.

Back in England, Edwards worked for Gibson Saddlers, rising to managing director. Edwards was the editor of Riding magazine for 18 years, and the consultant editor for Horse & Hound for five years. He served as a regional chairman of the British Horse Society and as a member of the BHS council, receiving the society's Award of Merit in 1993. He was a vice-president of the Riding for the Disabled Association, and vice-patron of the Horse and Pony Protection Association. He regularly judged horse shows in the UK and was an authority on lorinery (saddlery).

== Author ==
Edwards wrote more than 30 books on horse-related subjects. His books were translated into 12 languages, reprinted numerous times, and Edwards would revise them when there were new developments. Some books sold over a million copies.

Genevieve Murphy of The Independent called Edwards "one of the most prolific and authoritative equestrian writers of the 20th century." British Horse Society Chairman Patrick Print said: "He was a brilliant journalist and one of the world's leading authorities on saddlery and the history of it. He wrote many equestrian books which were published around the globe. Elwyn was a great historian of equitation and always wrote in a forthright manner, particularly in his regular column for the Society's magazine, British Horse." Cassandra Campbell at his publisher J.A. Allen remarked, "He was a true delight to work with, incredibly charming and generous and very, very funny."

== Selected works ==
- A Standard Guide to Horse & Pony Breeds. 1982. OL 10496697M.
- Bridleways of Britain. 1991. OL 21641826M.
- Complete Book of the Horse. 1982 [1973]. OL 22791625M.
- Encyclopedia of the Horse. 1985 [1977]. OL 21938319M.
- Making the Young Horse: The Rational Way. 2006. OL 8278202M.
- Saddlery: Modern Equipment for Horse and Stable. 1992 [1963]. OL 17911163M.
- The Complete Book of Bits & Bitting. 2000 [1990]. OL 3999124M.
- The Complete Book of Riding. 1993 [1989]. OL 15089197M.
- The Foot and Shoeing. 1989. OL 11342335M.
- Training Aids. 1990. OL 11597890M.
- Wild Horses of the World. 1995. OL 17381069M.

== Personal life ==
Edwards married Mary Hodgson in 1955 and they settled in Chwilog, Wales in the late 1950s. Together they had two daughters. Edwards died 9 December 2007.
