= John Gorham (physician) =

American physician

John Gorham (24 February 1783, Boston, Massachusetts - 29 March 1829, Boston) was an American medical doctor and educator.

== Biography ==
He graduated from Harvard in 1801, with a B.A., and later received two medical degrees there (M.B., 1804, after serving for three years as an apprentice to John Warren, whose daughter Mary he married in 1808, and M.D., 1811). Between his medical degrees, he studied chemistry privately in London with Friedrich Accum, and then with Thomas Hope at the University of Edinburgh. He opened a medical practice in Boston in 1806, and maintained it throughout his academic career. In 1809 he was appointed adjunct professor of chemistry and materia medica at Harvard, and in 1816 was made professor of chemistry and mineralogy. He was elected a Fellow of the American Academy of Arts and Sciences in 1810.

Gorham resigned from his academic position in 1827 to give more attention to his thriving medical practice. He was a librarian (1814-1818), treasurer (1818-1823) and recording secretary (1823-1826), for the Massachusetts Medical Society.

== Works ==
- Inaugural Address (1817), which prompted a letter of commendation from John Adams
- Elements of Chemical Science (1819)
- “Contribution on Sugar” in Thomas's Annual Philosophy (1817)
- “Chemical Analysis of Indian Corn,” The New England Journal of Medicine and Surgery, 9(1820):320-28.

He was a founder, and for 15 years an editor, of The New England Journal of Medicine and Surgery, where he published several papers.
