= Elwin =

Elwin may refer to:

- Elwen, Cornish saint
- Elwin, Illinois, United States, an unincorporated community
- Elwin L. Page (1876–1974), justice of the New Hampshire Supreme Court
- Hastings Elwin (1776–1852), British-Australian politician
- Whitwell Elwin (1816–1900), British clergyman and editor
- Maurice Elwin (1896–1975), British singer and songwriter, real name Norman Blair
- Verrier Elwin, (1902–1964), British-Indian anthropologist and ethnologist
- Ross Elwin (born 1946), retired Australian rules football player
- Keith Elwin, American pinball designer
- Elwin Ransom, fictional character from C.S. Lewis's Space Trilogy
