= Alvin (given name) =

Male given name

- Gender: Male

Other gender
- Feminine: Alvina

Other names
- Variant form: Elvin

Alvin is a male given name in several cultures.

In the Balkans, it is popular among Bosniaks in the former Yugoslav nations, as well as among Albanians. The name is a variation of Elvin, another name commonly used within these groups. Its popularity among these communities is likely due to its similarity to Aldin, a name also shared by many in the region.

== Etymology ==
Alvin was introduced in the 19th century based on surnames that were in turn derived from the Old English names Æthelwine and Ealdwine. The names mean "noble friend" and "old friend" respectively.

The corresponding German name is Alwin, which continues the Old High German names Albwin and Adalwin.

== Notable people with the given name ==
- Alvin Abundo (born 1992), Filipino basketball player
- Alvin Achenbaum (1925–2016), American businessman
- Alvin Ackerley, Great Britain and England international rugby league footballer
- Alvin Adams (1804–1877), early 19th-century American businessman
- Alvin P. Adams Jr. (1942–2015), American diplomat
- Alvin P. Adams Sr., American aviation executive
- Alvin Aguilar (born 1974), Filipino martial artist
- Alvin Ailey (1931–1989), African-American choreographer and activist
- Alvin Alcorn (1912–2003), American jazz trumpeter
- Alvin Alden (1818–1882), American businessman and politician
- Alvin L. Alm (1937–2000), American environmental regulator
- Alvin Alvarez (born 1989), American actor
- Alvin T. Amaral (1927–2014), American politician
- Alvin Eli Amason, American painter
- Alvin Anson (born 1962), Filipino actor
- Alvin Anthons (born 1976), Malaysian entertainer
- Alvin Arrondel (born 1993), French professional footballer
- Alvin Ashley (born 1969), American football player
- Alvin O. Austin (born 1942), American academic administrator
- Alvin Aubert (1930–2014), American poet and scholar
- Alvin Avinesh (born 1982), Fijian footballer
- Alvin Bailey (born 1990), American football player
- Alvin Baldus (1926–2017), American politician
- Alvin Baltrop (1948–2004), American photographer
- A. B. Barber (1883–1961), United States Army officer
- Alvin L. Barry (1931–2001), President of Lutheran Church - Missouri Synod (1992–2001)
- Alvin Batiste (1932–2007), American jazz clarinetist
- Alvin Bell (1901–1968), American football and basketball player and football official
- Alvin Gladstone Bennett (1918–2004), Jamaican writer
- Alvin Morell Bentley (1918–1969), American politician
- Alvin Bernard, Dominican politician
- Alvin Blount (born 1965), American gridiron football player
- Alvin Boretz (1919–2010), American screenwriter
- Alvin Botes (born 1973), South African politician
- Alvin J. Boutte (1929–2012), American banker and businessman
- Alvin Bowen (born 1983), American football player
- Alvin Bowman, American academic administrator
- Alvin Bragg (born 1973), American lawyer and politician
- Alvin Bronson (1783–1881), American politician
- Alvin Bronstein (1928–2015), American lawyer
- Alvin Brooks (basketball, born 1959) (born 1959), American basketball player and coach
- Alvin Brooks III (born 1979), American basketball player and coach
- Alvin Brown (disambiguation), multiple people
- Alvin Bubb (born 1980), Grenada international footballer
- Alvin Bullock (1906–1993), Canadian politician
- Alvin Burke, Jr. (born 1973), birth name of Hassan Hamin Assad, better known as Montel Vontavious Porter (MVP)
- Alvin Burroughs (c. 1911–1950), American jazz musician
- Alvin C. Bush (1924–2017), American politician
- Alvin Bush (1893–1959), American politician
- Alvin Cailan (born 1983), American chef and YouTuber
- Alvin Andrew Callender (1893–1918), American pursuit pilot and a flying ace in World War I
- Alvin B. Cardwell (1902–1992), American experimental physicist
- Alvin P. Carey (1916–1944), United States Army Medal of Honor recipient
- Alvin Carlsson (1891–1972), Swedish diver
- A. P. Carter (1891–1960), American singer-songwriter
- Alvin Cash (1939–1999), American actor and singer
- Alvin Cassel, American lawyer
- Alvin Ceccoli (born 1974), Australian footballer
- Alvin Duke Chandler (1902–1987), Rear Admiral of the United States
- Alvin Chau (born 1989), Macanese businessman and criminal
- Alvin Childress (1907–1986), American actor
- Alvin J. Clasen (1892–1971), American politician
- Alvin Langdon Coburn (1882–1966), American photographer
- Alvin Aaron Coffey Sr. (1822–1902) African American pioneer, miner, and farmer in California; who was formerly enslaved
- Alvin Colina (born 1981), Venezuelan baseball player
- Alvin Colt (1916–2008), American costume designer
- Alvin Cooperman (1923–2006), American television producer
- Alvin Coox (1924–1999), American military historian and author
- Alvin Corneal (born 1937), Trinidad and Tobago footballer and cricketer
- Alvin Robert Cornelius (1903–1991), Pakistani judge
- Alvin Crowder (1899–1972), American baseball player
- Alvin H. Culver (1873–1955), American football player and coach
- Alvin Curling (born 1939), Jamaican-born Canadian politician
- Alvin Curran (born 1938), American musician and composer
- Alvin Daniel (born 1969), Trinidad and Tobago sprinter
- Alvin Daniels (born 1994), French Guianan professional footballer
- Alvin Dark (1922–2014), Major League Baseball player and manager
- Alvin Darling (born 1948), American gospel musician
- Alvin Davis (born 1960), Major League Baseball player
- Alvin J. DeGrow (1926–2016), American politician
- Alvin Deutsch (1932–2021), American lawyer
- Alvin Devane (1923–2012), American singer and police lieutenant
- Alvin Dewey (1912–1987), American police officer
- Alvin Swen Dixon (born 1993), Liberian footballer
- Alvin E. Dodd (1883–1951), American consulting engineer
- Alvin Joseph Downing (c. 1916–2000), American jazz musician
- Alvin Drew (born 1962), American astronaut
- Alvin Dueck, American psychologist and theologian
- Alvin Duncan (1913–2009), Canadian historian
- Alvin Duskin (1931–2021), American educator, entrepreneur and activist
- Alvin R. Dyer (1903–1977), American Mormon leader
- Alvin Eisenman (1921–2013), American graphic designer
- Alvin Elchico (born 1974), Filipino broadcast journalist
- Alvin Endt (1933–2016), American politician
- Alvin Epstein (1925–2018), American actor
- Alvin Etler (1913–1973), American composer and musician
- Alvin Evans (1845–1906), American politician
- Alvin Feldman (1927–1981), American airline executive and mechanical engineer
- Alvin S. Felzenberg, American historian
- Alvin Fielder (1935–2019), American jazz drummer
- Alvin Fisher (1893–1937), Canadian ice hockey player
- Alvin Fortes (born 1994), Cape Verdean footballer
- Alvin Francisco (born 1987), Filipino radiologist and media personality
- Alvin Frankenberg (1923–2011), American lawyer
- Alvin T. Fuller (1878–1958), American businessman and politician
- Alvin Gajadhur (born 1973), Polish politician, statesman, chemical engineer, and educator
- Alvin Ganzer (1911–2009), American film director
- Alvin Garcia (born 1946), Filipino politician and lawyer
- Alvin Gardiner (born 1951), Australian tennis player
- Alvin Garrett (born 1956), American football player
- Alvin Gentry (born 1954), American basketball player and coach
- Alvin Gipson (1914–1987), American baseball player
- Alvin Gittins (1922–1981), English painter
- Alvin Goldfarb, American academic
- Alvin Goldman (1938–2024), American philosopher
- Alvin Gouldner (1920–1980), American sociologist and activist
- Alvin Edwin Graham, Canadian politician
- Alvin C. Graves (1909–1965), American nuclear physicist
- A. C. Greene (1923–2002), American journalist and politician
- Alvin Greene (born 1977), American political candidate
- Alvin Greenidge (born 1956), West Indian cricketer
- Alvin F. Grospiron (1916–1985), American labor leader
- Alvin Abdul Halim (born 1998), Indonesian footballer
- Alvin Hall (disambiguation), multiple people
- Alvin Hamilton (1912–2004), Canadian politician
- Alvin A. Handrich (1892–1981), American farmer, businessman and politician
- Alvin Hansen (1887–1975), American economist
- Alvin F. Harlow (1875–1963), American writer and biographer
- Alvin Harper (born 1967), American football player
- Alvin Harrison (born 1974), American Olympic gold medal runner
- Alvin Hart (disambiguation), multiple people
- Alvin Hawkins (1821–1905), American judge
- Alvin Hayes, American jazz musician
- Alvin Haymond (1942–2024), American football player
- Alvin Haynes (born 1968), Barbadian triple jumper
- Alvin Heaps (1919–1986), American labor union leader
- Alvin Heggs (born 1967), American basketball player
- Alvin Hellerstein (1933–2026), American federal judge
- Alvin Henderson (American football) (born 2006), American football player
- Alvin Henry, Trinidad and Tobago sprinter
- Alvin Tobias Hert (1865–1921), American politician
- Alvin Hewlett (born 1937), Canadian politician
- Alvin O. Hofstad (1905–1962), American farmer and politician
- Alvin Hollingsworth (1928–2000), American painter and comic book artist
- Alvin Holmes (1939–2020), American politician
- Alvin Holsey, United States Navy admiral
- Alvin P. Hovey (1821–1891), American Civil War general, Indiana supreme court justice, congressman, and governor of Indiana
- Alvin Howard, American cricketer
- Alvin Huang, Chinese-American architect
- Alvin Hung, creator of GoAnimate
- Alvin Hudson (born 1976), Canadian soccer player
- Alvin Ing (1932–2021), American singer and actor
- Alvin Jacklick (born 1949), Marshallese politician
- Alvin Jackson (disambiguation), multiple people
- Alvin C. Jacobs Jr. (born 1974), American documentary photographer
- Alvin Jaeger (born 1943), American politician
- Alvin James, Jamaican-American soccer player
- Alvin Jemmott (1906–?), Guyanese cricketer
- Alvin Johnson (disambiguation), multiple people
- Alvin M. Johnston (1914–1998), American test pilot
- Alvin Nathaniel Joiner, better known by his stage name Xzibit (born 1974), American rapper and actor
- Alvin Jones (disambiguation), multiple people
- Alvin M. Josephy Jr. (1915–2005), American journalist and civil rights activist
- Alvin Kahle (1909–1986), American politician
- Alvin Kallicharran (born 1949), West Indian cricketer
- Alvin Kamara (born 1995), American football player
- Alvin Karadža (born 1984), Bosnian-Herzegovinian footballer
- Alvin Karpis (1907–1979), noted American criminal and "public enemy"
- Alvin Katz (born 1936), American politician
- Alvin Ratz Kaufman (1885–1979), Canadian industrialist and birth control advocate
- Alvin Kelly (disambiguation), multiple people
- Alvin Olin King (1890–1958), American politician
- Alvin Kirkland, American rugby league and gridiron player
- Alvin Paul Kitchin (1908–1983), American politician
- Alvin Klein (c. 1938–2009), American journalist and theater critic
- Alvin Kletsch (1861–1941), American football coach
- Alvin Kraenzlein (1876–1928), American athlete, four-time gold medalist at the 1900 Paris Olympics
- Alvin Krenzler (1921–2010), American judge
- A. B. Krongard (born 1936), executive director of the CIA
- Alvin Boyd Kuhn (1880–1963), American religious scholar
- Alvin H. Kukuk (1937–2017), American politician
- Alvin La Feuille (born 1978), West Indies cricketer
- Alvin Landy, American bridge player
- Alvin Law, Canadian motivational speaker and radio broadcaster
- Alvin Lee (comics) (born 1980), Canadian comic book artist
- Alvin Lee, born Graham Barnes (1944–2013), English guitarist and singer
- Alvin Leung (born 1961), Canadian chef and television personality
- Alvin Levin, American writer
- Alvin Lewis (disambiguation), multiple people
- Alvin Liberman (1917–2000), American linguist
- Alvin Libin (born 1931), Canadian businessman and philanthropist
- Alvin Lie (born 1961), Indonesian politician
- Alvin Francis Lindsay (1882–1957), American politician
- Alvin Loftes (1890–1971), American cyclist
- Alvin Loucks (1895–1973), American football player and coach
- Alvin D. Loving (1935–2005), African-American abstract expressionist painter
- Alvin Lucier (1931–2021), American composer
- Alvin Luedecke (1910–1998), United States Air Force general
- Alvin Lustig (1915–1955), American graphic and interior designer
- Alvin Maccornell (born 1993), Liberian footballer
- Alvin Malnik (born 1933), American businessman and attorney
- Alvin Manley (born 1971), American boxer
- Alvin Marriott (1902–1992), Jamaican sculptor
- Alvin Martin (born 1958), English footballer
- Alvin Maxson (1951–2022), American football player
- Alvin McCoy (1903–1988), American journalist
- Alvin McDonald (c. 1873–1893), American caver and tour guide
- Alvin McKinley (born 1978), American football player
- Alvin Coulter McLean, Canadian politician from Ontario
- Alvin Mendoza (born 1984), Mexican footballer
- Alvin F. Meredith III (born 1970), American current president
- Alvin Mitchell (disambiguation), multiple people
- Alvin Moore (disambiguation), multiple people
- Alvin Morada (born 1997), Filipino badminton player
- Alvin Morman (born 1969), American baseball player
- Alvin Cecil Murray (1895–1949), Canadian politician and farmer
- Alvin Ng (born 1994), Hong Kong male singer, host and actor under Voice Entertainment
- Alvin K. C. Ng (born 1989), apprentice jockey in Hong Kong
- Alvin Andreas Herborg Nielsen (1910–1994), American physicist in molecular spectroscopy
- Alvin Nnabuife (born 1983), American football player
- Alvin O'Konski (1904–1987), American politician and educator
- Alvin Obinna Okoro (born 2005), Nigerian football player
- Alvin Osterback (1915–2005), American businessman, commercial fisherman and politician
- Alvin Otieno (born 1994), Kenyan rugby sevens player
- Alvin Ott (born 1949), American politician
- Alvin M. Owsley (1888–1967), American diplomat
- Alvin Pam, American psychologist
- Alvin Pang (born 1972), Chinese poet
- Alvin Pankhurst (1949–2024), New Zealand magic realist artist
- Alvin Parker (born c. 1977), American football coach
- Alvin Pasaol (born 1995), Filipino basketball player
- Alvin Patrimonio (born 1966), Filipino basketball player
- Alvin Seeco Patterson (1930–2021), Jamaican percussionist
- Alvin Payton, American politician
- Alvin Pearman (born 1982), American football player
- Alvin Penn (1949–2003), American politician
- Alvin H. Perlmutter, American film producer
- Alvin Pierson (1898–1974), American football player and coach
- Alvin Plantinga (born 1932), American philosopher
- Alvin Plumb (1802–1877), American politician
- Alvin Porter (born 1976), American football player
- Alvin Francis Poussaint (1934–2025), American psychiatrist
- Alvin Powell (born 1959), American football player
- Alvin Prouder, American kickboxer
- Alvin J. Quackenbush, American politician
- Alvin Queen (born 1950), American-born Swiss jazz drummer
- Alvin Rabushka (born 1940), American economist
- Alvin Radkowsky (1915–2002), American nuclear physicist
- Alvin Rakoff (1927–2024), Canadian film and television director
- Alvin Ranglin, Jamaican musician and record producer
- Alvin J. Redford (1883–1974), American politician and police officer
- Alvin Reed (born 1944), American football player
- Alvin C. Reis (1892–1956), American lawyer and Wisconsin Circuit Court Judge, member of the Wisconsin Senate and Assembly
- Alvin Rentería (born 1978), Colombian triple jumper
- Alvin Rettig (born 1963), American football player
- Alvin Reynolds (born 1959), American football player and coach
- Alvin Risk, American record producer
- Alvin Robertson (born 1962), NBA basketball player
- Alvin Robinson (musician) (1937–1989), American musician
- Alvin Robinson (born 1982), American mixed martial arts fighter
- Alvin Hirsch Rosenfeld, American scholar of religion
- Alvin Roth (disambiguation), multiple people
- Alvin Rouse (born 1982), Barbadian footballer
- Alvin Benjamin Rubin (1920–1991), American judge
- Alvin Saldaña (born 1976), Chilean lawyer
- Alvin Salehi, American technology executive
- Alvin J. Salkind (1927–2015), American chemical engineer
- Alvin Sanders (born 1952), American voice actor
- Alvin Sargent (1927–2019), American screenwriter
- Alvin Sariaatmadja (born 1983), Indonesian entrepreneur and investor
- Alvin Saunders (1817–1899), governor of Nebraska Territory and later U.S. Senator from Nebraska
- Alvin Anthony Schall (born 1944), American judge
- Alvin Schwartz (disambiguation), multiple people
- Alvin Scott (born 1955), American basketball player
- Alvin See, American politician
- Alvin Segal (1933–2022), American-Canadian businessman
- Alvin Sella (1919–2013), American painter and educator
- Alvin Setzepfandt (1924–2013), American politician
- Alvin P. Shapiro (1920–1998), American politician
- Alvin Barrett Sheehan (1899–1967), American entertainment businessman and radio host
- Alvin Shrier, Canadian scientist
- Alvin Simes, lawyer and state legislator in Arkansas
- Alvin Sims (born 1974), American basketball player
- Alvin Singh (born 1988), Fijian footballer
- Alvin Singleton (born 1940), American composer
- Alvin Slaughter (born 1955), American singer
- Alvin Smith (disambiguation), multiple people
- Alvin Snow (born 1981), American basketball player
- Alvin Snyder (1936–2019), American journalist and author
- Alvin F. Sortwell (1854–1910), American politician
- Alvin Milton Spessard (1960–1924), American politician from Alabama
- Alvin Stardust, born Bernard Jewry (1942–2014), English pop singer
- Alvin Williams Stokes (1904–1982), African-American investigator for the federal government
- Alvin Stoller (1925–1992), American drummer
- Alvin Straight (1920–1996), American man who became notable for traveling on a lawnmower
- Alvin M. Strauss, American architect
- Alvin C. Strutz (1903–1973), American judge
- Alvin M. Suchin (1919–1991), American politician
- Alvin Sykes (1956–2021), American civil rights activist
- Alvin Tan (disambiguation), multiple people
- Alvin Taylor (serial killer), American serial killer
- Alvin Taylor (born 1953), American drummer
- Alvin Tehau (born 1989), Tahitian footballer
- Alvin Tehupeiory (born 1995), Indonesian sprinter
- Alvin Teng (born 1965), Filipino basketball player
- Alvin W. Thompson (born 1953), American judge
- Alvin Thornton, American university administrator
- Alvin Todd (1903–1964), American film editor
- Alvin Toffler (1928–2016), American writer and futurist
- Alvin Toles (born 1963), American football player
- Alvin V. Tollestrup (1924–2020), American physicist
- Alvin Townley (born 1975), American author
- Alvin Tresselt (1916–2000), American children’s book author
- Alvin Trivelpiece (1931–2022), American physicist
- Alvin S. Trow, American politician
- Alvin Twitchell (1892–1955), American football and basketball coach
- Alvin Tyler (1925–1998), American musician
- Alvin Ubell, American architectural designer
- Alvin Valley, American fashion designer
- Alvin Vogtle (1918–1994), American lawyer, executive, World War II pilot and POW
- Alvin C. Voris (1827–1904), American politician and military officer from Ohio
- Alvin Ray Skip Walker (1954–2022), American gridiron football player
- Alvin Walton (born 1964), American football player
- Alvin F. Weichel (1891–1956), American politician
- Alvin M. Weinberg (1915–2006), American nuclear physicist
- Alvin C. Weingand (1904–1995), American politician
- Alvin White (disambiguation), multiple people
- Alvin Wiederspahn (1949–2014), American politician and attorney
- Alvin Williams (born 1974), American basketball player
- Alvin Williams (American football) (born 1965), American football player
- Alvin J. Wirtz (1888–1951), American politician
- Alvin Wistert (1916–2005), American football player
- Alvin Wolfe (1928–2024), American anthropologist
- Alvin Wood, 19th-century American settler
- Alvin Wright (1961–2018), American football player
- Alvin Wyatt (born 1947), American football player and sports coach
- Alvin Wyckoff (1877–1957), American cinematographer
- Alvin Yapan, Filipino film director
- Alvin Yeo (1962–2022), Singaporean lawyer and politician
- Alvin Yeryomin (1932–2023), Russian economist and politician
- Alvin Yeung (born 1981), Hong Kong barrister and politician
- Alvin C. York (1887–1964), World War I soldier, Medal of Honor awardee
- Alvin Young (born 1975), American professional basketball player

== Pseudonyms ==
- Alvin, one of many pseudonyms of Ken Laszlo, Eurobeat vocalist

== Fictional characters ==
- Alvin Seville, one of the animated characters from Alvin and the Chipmunks
- Alvin Tarleton, father of M.O.D.O.K. in the miniseries M.O.D.O.K.: Head Games
- Father Alvin, in the 2018 role-playing video game Deltarune
- Alvin Miller, the main protagonist of the alternate history fantasy novel series The Tales of Alvin Maker
- Alvin ''Knuckles'' Gable, an antagonist character from 2025 action-comedy film Love Hurts
- Alvin Marsh, an character from an supernatural horror movie IT

== See also ==
- Alvin (disambiguation)
- Alvin (surname)
- Alwin (disambiguation)
- Alboin (disambiguation)
