= Al Downing (disambiguation) =

Al Downing is an American baseball pitcher.

Al Downing may also refer to:

- Alvin Joseph Downing (1916–2000), jazz musician
- Big Al Downing (1940–2005), entertainer, singer, songwriter, and pianist
