= Jack Thomas (academic) =

11th President of Western Illinois University

11th President of Western Illinois University
- In office 2011–2019
- Preceded by: Alvin Goldfarb
- Succeeded by: Martin Abraham (interim)

Personal details
- Spouse: Linda Thomas
- Children: 2
- Education: Alabama A&M University (BA); Virginia State University (MEd); Indiana University of Pennsylvania (PhD)
- Website: jackthomasleadership.com

Jack Thomas is an American former academic administrator who served as the 9th president of the Central State University from 2020 to 2023. Previously, he served as the 11th President of Western Illinois University from 2011 to 2019. He was the first Black President of Western Illinois University.

== Early life and education ==
Thomas was born in the U.S. He earned a B.A. in English from Alabama A&M University in 1983, a M.Ed. in English Education from Virginia State University in 1984, and a Ph.D. in English Literature and Criticism from Indiana University of Pennsylvania in 1990.

== Career ==
=== Early academic appointments ===
Thomas began his academic career as the Writing Center Director at Johnson C. Smith University, where he also coached track and field. He subsequently taught English at South Carolina State University before joining the University of Maryland Eastern Shore, where he served as professor and chair of the Department of English and Modern Languages, as well as in roles including associate vice president for academic and student affairs, executive vice president, and interim president. He later moved to Middle Tennessee State University as senior vice provost for academic affairs, interim dean of the College of Continuing Education and Distance Learning, and professor of English.

=== Western Illinois University ===
Thomas joined Western Illinois University in January 2008 as provost and academic vice president. In January 2011, the WIU Board of Trustees named him the institution's 11th president, effective July 1, 2011. He succeeded Al Goldfarb and became the first African American to lead the university. During his presidency, WIU established 17 new academic programs, launched the President's Executive Institute, and opened a new campus in Moline, Illinois. However, enrollment at the main campus dropped from roughly 12,554 students in fall 2011 to about 7,600 by 2019, more than 100 employees were laid off, and several dormitories were demolished.

In May 2019, the WIU Alumni Council and the WIU Foundation both publicly called for Thomas's resignation, and signs reading "Fire Jack" appeared in storefronts near campus. Some supporters alleged that the campaign to remove him was racially motivated, while critics argued his administration had failed to reverse the enrollment decline. On June 14, 2019, he announced that he would be resigning from his position as president, effective June 30. Upon Thomas's resignation, incoming provost Martin Abraham succeeded him as the university's acting president while the Board of Trustees conducted a national search for a new president.

==== Western Illinois exit package ====
Thomas's departure from Western Illinois University drew sustained criticism over his negotiated exit package, which granted him two years of paid administrative leave at his base salary of US$270,528, plus annual annuity contributions of US$27,000, life insurance, and health insurance, after which he could return as a tenured professor at no less than US$225,000 annually. The WIU Board of Trustees approved a US$900,000 settlement and general release in August 2019.

Illinois lawmakers characterized the arrangement as a "golden parachute" and accused the Board of Trustees of circumventing the spirit of the Illinois Government Severance Pay Act, which had taken effect earlier in 2019 to limit such payouts. The Illinois Attorney General's Office subsequently ruled that the Board had violated open meetings provisions in approving the package. University officials maintained that Thomas's 2011 contract had been grandfathered in and that the agreement constituted a transition rather than a severance arrangement.

=== Central State University ===
In July 2020, Thomas became president of Central State University, Ohio's only public historically Black university, amid the COVID-19 campus shutdowns. His tenure saw the implementation of a strategic plan and a $75 million expansion of the campus, which involved the construction of seven new buildings. He stepped down from his role in May 2023.

==== Central State investigation and lawsuits ====
In August 2022, five current and former Central State employees, all Black women who had held leadership positions including university spokesperson, director of admissions, and university registrar, submitted a letter to the Board of Trustees alleging that Thomas had created a "toxic work culture" involving discrimination, wrongful demotions, pay inequities, harassment, intimidation, and violations of the Family and Medical Leave Act. The complaint stated that the alleged conduct was "aimed at women, primarily African-American women."

In September 2022, the Ohio Attorney General's Office, at the request of the Board of Trustees, retained the Cincinnati law firm Taft, Stettinius and Hollister to conduct an independent investigation. A report presented to trustees on February 7, 2023, concluded that Thomas's leadership style toward the complainants could be characterized as "rude, belittling and bullying," but did not rise to the level of harassment or discrimination.

In April 2023, two of the women filed a lawsuit against the university alleging unfair demotion, pay inequities, and retaliation; their attorney stated that the suit would proceed despite Thomas's announced departure. Thomas denied harassing, belittling, or bullying anyone, and several Central State administrators publicly defended his character and questioned the thoroughness of the investigation. A group of Black women political leaders, including Ohio state senator Paula Hicks-Hudson and former state senator Rhine McLin, later published an op-ed defending Thomas's leadership.

== Personal life ==
Thomas and his wife, Linda, have two sons, Patrick and Darius. Since 2005, he has been a member of Alpha Phi Alpha fraternity.
