= Edwin Wilson (theater critic) =

American theater critic (1927–2023)

- Born: November 10, 1927; Nashville, Tennessee
- Died: December 2, 2023 (aged 96)
- Education: Vanderbilt University; University of Edinburgh; Yale University
- Occupation: Theater critic
- Years active: 1972–1994
- Employer: The Wall Street Journal
- Spouse: Catherine "Chic" Wilson (m. 1967)

Edwin Wilson (November 10, 1927 – December 2, 2023) was an American theater critic. He most notably worked for The Wall Street Journal from 1972 to 1994.

== Early life and education ==
Born in Nashville on November 10, 1927, Wilson studied at Vanderbilt University, University of Edinburgh, and Yale University, and received the first Doctor of Fine Arts degree awarded by Yale.

== Career ==
Wilson taught at Hunter College and the CUNY Graduate Center for thirty years. He was the president of the New York Drama Critics' Circle and the Theatre Development Fund, the chairman of the Pulitzer Prize Drama Jury, and a board member of the Susan Smith Blackburn Prize and the John Golden Fund.

Wilson was either the author or co-author, with Alvin Goldfarb, of several widely used text books on theater.

He hosted a television series called Spotlight with Ed Wilson, which was produced by the Center for Advanced Study of the Theatre Arts (CASTA, now the Martin E. Segal Theater Center) at the CUNY Graduate Center and CUNY TV. His 90 television interviews with theater artists appeared on 200 PBS stations around the country, and can be watched in a playlist on YouTube.

== Death ==
Wilson died on December 2, 2023, at the age of 96.

== Books ==
Wilson's books included:

- Wilson, Edwin (2019). Magic Time: a Memoir. Hanover, NH : Smith and Kraus. ISBN 9781575259420.
- Wilson, Edwin; Goldfarb, Alvin (2018). Living Theatre: A History of Theatre (7th ed.). New York: Norton. ISBN 9780072562576.
- Wilson, Edwin; Goldfarb, Alvin (2016). Theatre: The Lively Art (9th ed.). Boston: McGraw-Hill Education. ISBN 9780073514307.
- Wilson, Edwin (2015). The Theatre Experience (13th ed.). New York: McGraw-Hill Education. ISBN 9780073514277.
- Wilson, Edwin; Goldfarb, Alvin, eds. (2008). Anthology of Living Theatre (3rd ed.). Boston: McGraw-Hill. ISBN 9780073514130.
- Shaw, Bernard (2002). Wilson, Edwin (ed.). Shaw on Shakespeare. New York: Applause. ISBN 9781557835611.
- Wilson, Edwin (2015). The Patron Murders. Westport, CT: Prospecta Press. ISBN 9781632260420.

He also wrote a novel, The Patron Murders.
