= Bellevoir-Ormsby Village =

Historic house in Kentucky, United States

- U.S. National Register of Historic Places
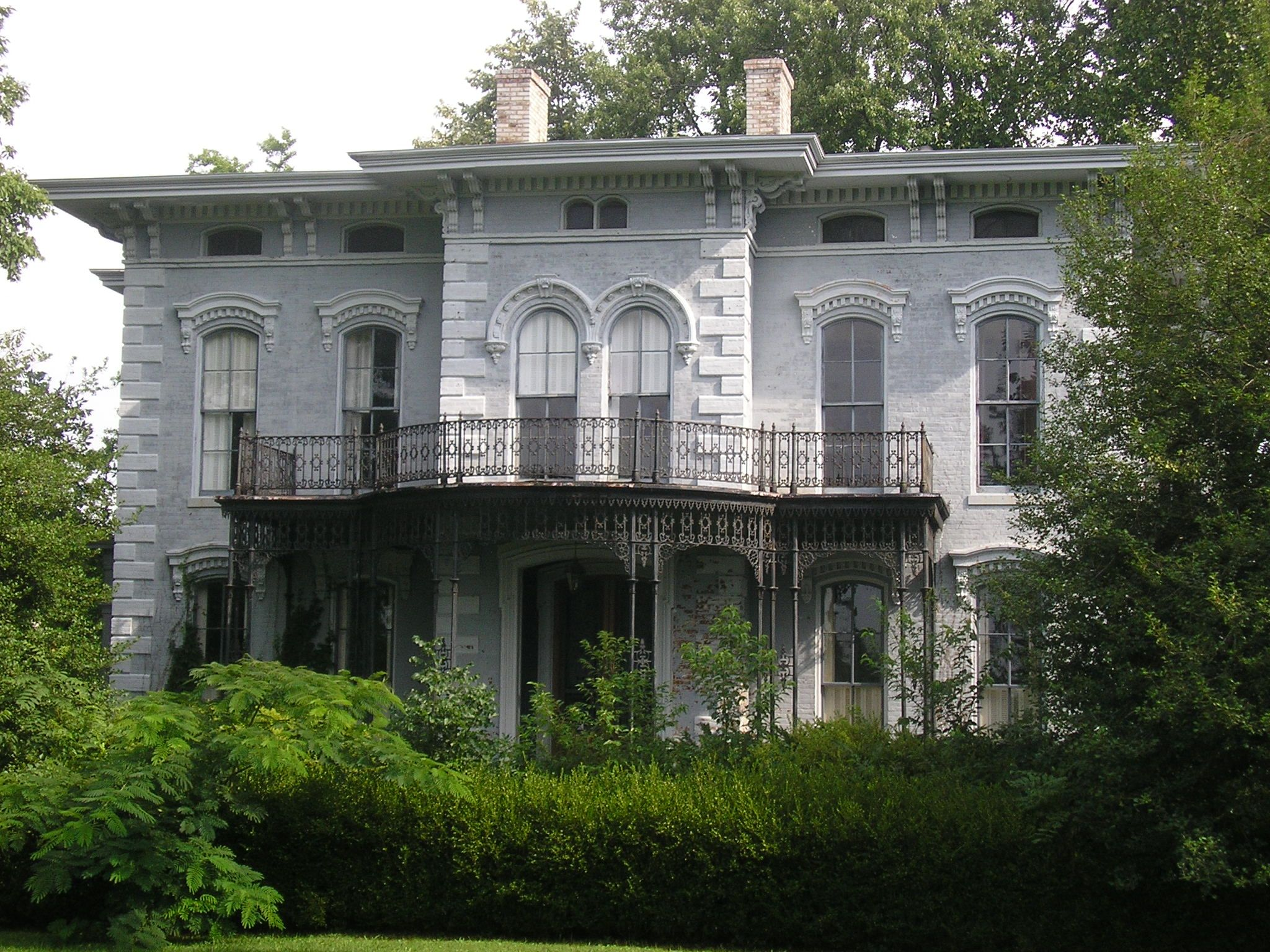

- Location within Kentucky Location within the United States
- Coordinates: 38°16′01″N 85°34′33″W
- Built: 1867
- Architectural style: Italianate
- NRHP reference No.: 80001632
- Added to NRHP: December 5, 1980

Bellevoir is a historic home in Lyndon, Kentucky, a part of the Louisville metropolitan area.

The house was built ca. 1867 and added to the National Register of Historic Places in 1980.

The Italianate-style home was built by Hamilton Ormsby, a member of a prominent family in Jefferson County. It is a 2 1/2-story brick house.

The property was later used as a children's home with its own school. The children's home began in 1912 as the Parental Home and School. It later merged with the Louisville Industrial School of Reform (formerly the Louisville House of Refuge) and was known as the Louisville and Jefferson County Children's Home. When it moved to the old Ormsby family farm, the home became Ormsby Village, serving dependent and delinquent children. The site originally had a separate home and school, Ridgewood, for African-American children. Segregation was ended in the early 1960s, and the homes were merged into Ormsby Village. The home was changed to the Ormsby Village Treatment Center in 1968, serving only delinquent children. It closed in 1979. The buildings were used by Jefferson County government for offices during the 1980s until the property was developed as an office park. Although the institutional buildings were razed, the Ormsby family home, Bellevoir, was preserved.

The office park development plan called for preservation of 14 acres surrounding the Bellevoir mansion, with the historic building serving as a center for meetings and receptions.

== See also ==
- National Register of Historic Places listings in Jefferson County, Kentucky
