= Lyndon, Kentucky =

- City
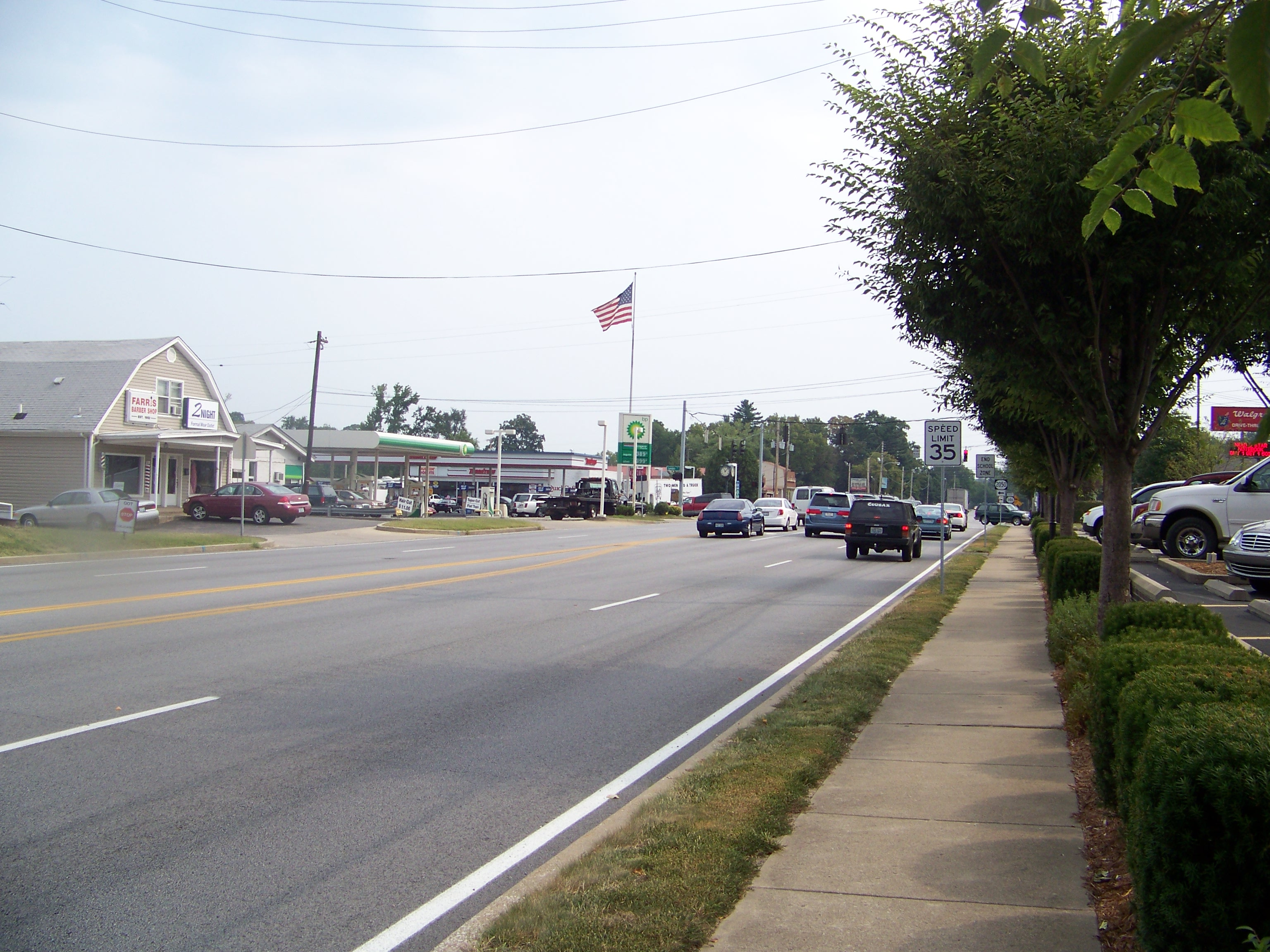
- Lyndon, Kentucky

- Location of Lyndon in Jefferson County, Kentucky

- Location within the state of Kentucky Lyndon (the United States)
- Coordinates: 38°15′52″N 85°35′21″W
- Country: United States
- State: Kentucky
- County: Jefferson

Area
  - Total: 3.63 sq mi (9.41 km^{2})
  - Land: 3.60 sq mi (9.33 km^{2})
  - Water: 0.031 sq mi (0.08 km^{2})
- Elevation: 620 ft (190 m)

Population (2020)
  - Total: 11,008
  - Density: 3,056.9/sq mi (1,180.28/km^{2})
- Time zone: UTC-5 (Eastern (EST))
  - Summer (DST): UTC-4 (EDT)
- ZIP codes: 40222, 40241-40242, 40252
- Area code: 502
- FIPS code: 21-48558
- GNIS feature ID: 2404980
- Website: cityoflyndon.org

Lyndon is a home rule-class city in Jefferson County, Kentucky, United States. As of the 2020 census, Lyndon had a population of 11,008.

Incorporated on May 10, 1965, Lyndon became part of the new Louisville Metro government in 2003. It remains an independent city with its own mayor and emergency services and is not counted in Louisville's population although its citizens can vote for the mayor of Louisville and Metro Council members.

== History ==
The area is the home of Oxmoor Farm, the residence of Alexander Scott Bullitt, one of the drafters of Kentucky's first constitution.

At some point after 1865, the Louisville and Nashville Railroad offered local landowner Alvin Wood connection to their network provided that he pay the costs of constructing the station and donate the land for the spur. He did so, and in 1871 the Lyndon depot began service. The town's etymology remains uncertain, although some connect it to Linn's Station and others to explorer William Linn.

The Bellevoir-Ormsby Village was built in 1867 and Kentucky Military Institute moved to the town in 1896. Central State Hospital is also near Lyndon.

In 1963, Lyndon's post office was subsumed by the Louisville system. Lyndon was incorporated soon after in order to avoid annexation by the neighboring city of St. Matthews.

== Geography ==
Lyndon is located in northeastern Jefferson County. It is 9 miles (14 km) east of downtown Louisville. Nearby Louisville suburbs include Graymoor-Devondale to the northwest, St. Matthews to the southwest, Hurstbourne to the south, and Anchorage to the east. U.S. Route 60 (Shelbyville Road) forms part of the southern boundary of Lyndon.

According to the United States Census Bureau, the city has a total area of 3.6 square miles (9.4 km^{2}), of which 0.03 square miles (0.09 km^{2}), or 0.91%, are water.

== Demographics ==
Historical population
Census	Pop.	Note	%±
1970	460		—
1980	1,553		237.6%
1990	8,037		417.5%
2000	9,369		16.6%
2010	11,002		17.4%
2020	11,008		0.1%
2024 (est.)	11,221		1.9%
U.S. Decennial Census

=== 2020 census ===
As of the 2020 census, Lyndon had a population of 11,008. The median age was 36.3 years. 17.4% of residents were under the age of 18 and 17.1% of residents were 65 years of age or older. For every 100 females there were 93.8 males, and for every 100 females age 18 and over there were 91.4 males age 18 and over.

100.0% of residents lived in urban areas, while 0.0% lived in rural areas.

There were 5,568 households in Lyndon, of which 21.0% had children under the age of 18 living in them. Of all households, 30.5% were married-couple households, 25.5% were households with a male householder and no spouse or partner present, and 34.7% were households with a female householder and no spouse or partner present. About 42.9% of all households were made up of individuals and 12.9% had someone living alone who was 65 years of age or older.

There were 6,024 housing units, of which 7.6% were vacant. The homeowner vacancy rate was 1.4% and the rental vacancy rate was 9.5%.

Racial composition as of the 2020 census
Race	Number	Percent
White	7,919	71.9%
Black or African American	1,525	13.9%
American Indian and Alaska Native	46	0.4%
Asian	309	2.8%
Native Hawaiian and Other Pacific Islander	1	0.0%
Some other race	358	3.3%
Two or more races	850	7.7%
Hispanic or Latino (of any race)	836	7.6%

=== 2010 census ===
At the 2010 census, there were 11,002 people, 5,374 households and 2,585 families residing in the city. The racial makeup of the city was 80.4% White, 11.4% African American, 0.2% Native American, 2.1% Asian, 0.00% Pacific Islander, 3.3% from other races, and 2.6% from two or more races. Hispanic or Latino of any race were 6.9% of the population.

There were 5,374 households, of which 22.9% had children under the age of 18 living with them, 32.9% were married couples living together, 11.2% had a female householder with no husband present, and 51.9% were non-families. 41.4% of all households were made up of individuals, and 7.2% and 2.8% had female or male individuals over the age of 65 years of age or older living alone respectively. The average household size was 2.02 and the average family size was 2.79.

20% of the population were under the age of 18, 9.4% from 20 to 24, 34.1% from 25 to 44, 22.2% from 45 to 64, and 12.4% who were 65 years of age or older. The median age was 33 years. For every 100 females, there were 95.6 males. For every 100 females age 18 and over, there were 91.5 males.

=== 2017 American Community Survey ===
At the 2017 American Community Survey estimate, the median household income was $52,431 and the median family income was $71,025. Males had a median income of $47,719 and females $45,656. The per capita income $34,183. About 2.7% of families and 6.8% of the population were below the poverty line, including 4.1% of those under age 18 and 0.6% of those age 65 or over.

== Robsion Park ==
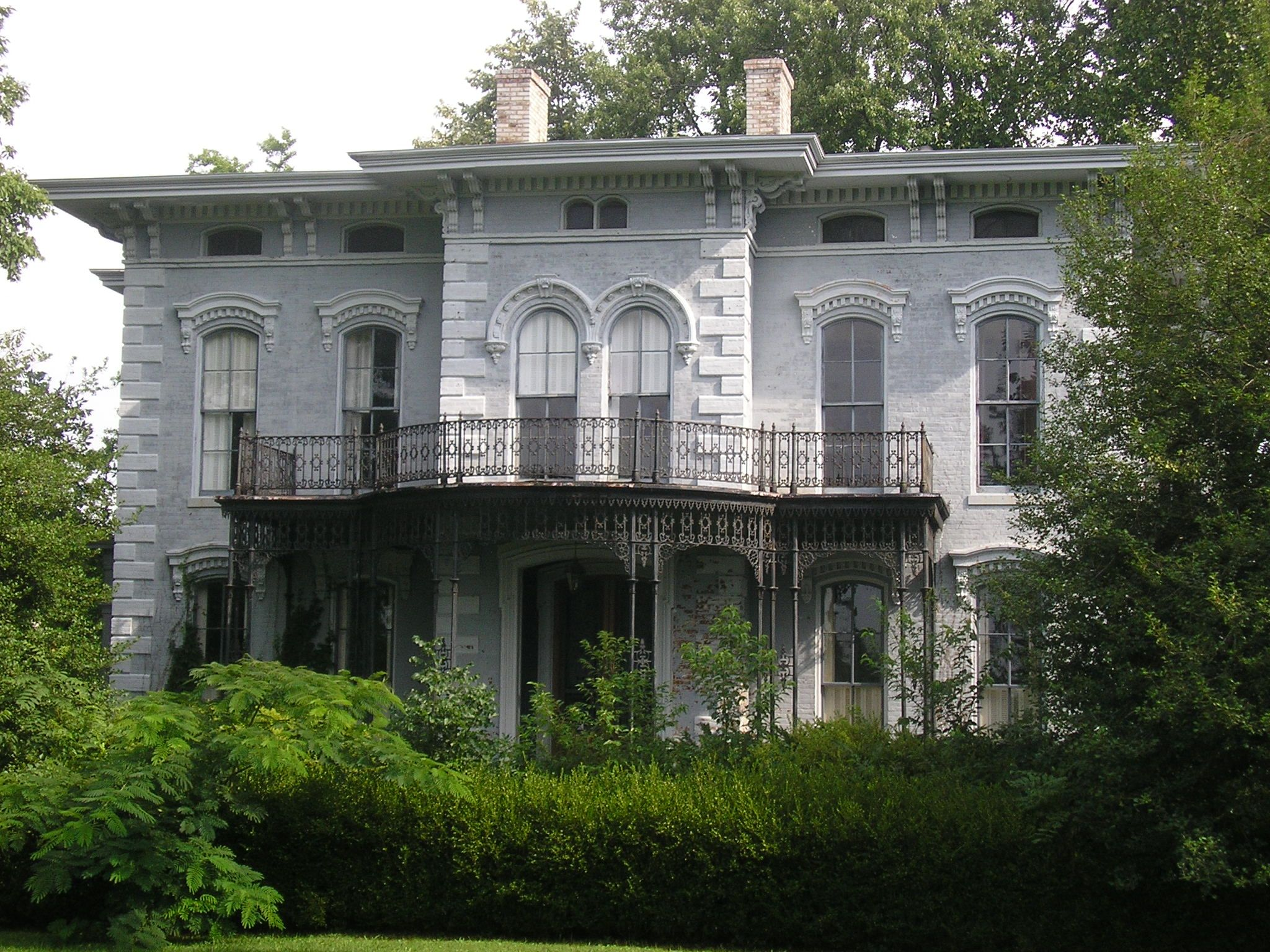
Bellevoir-Ormsby Village, historic Bellevoir mansion

The 17-acre park is located in the middle of Lyndon, between Lake Avenue and LaGrange Road. It has benches, picnic tables, a pavilion, two age appropriate playgrounds, a new splash pad, and a 3/8 mile walking trail. The park is named for John M. Robsion Jr. who donated the land in 1985.

== Economy ==
- Kroger's Mid-South offices are in Lyndon.
- UPS Air Group
- Westport Village Shopping Complex

== Gallery ==
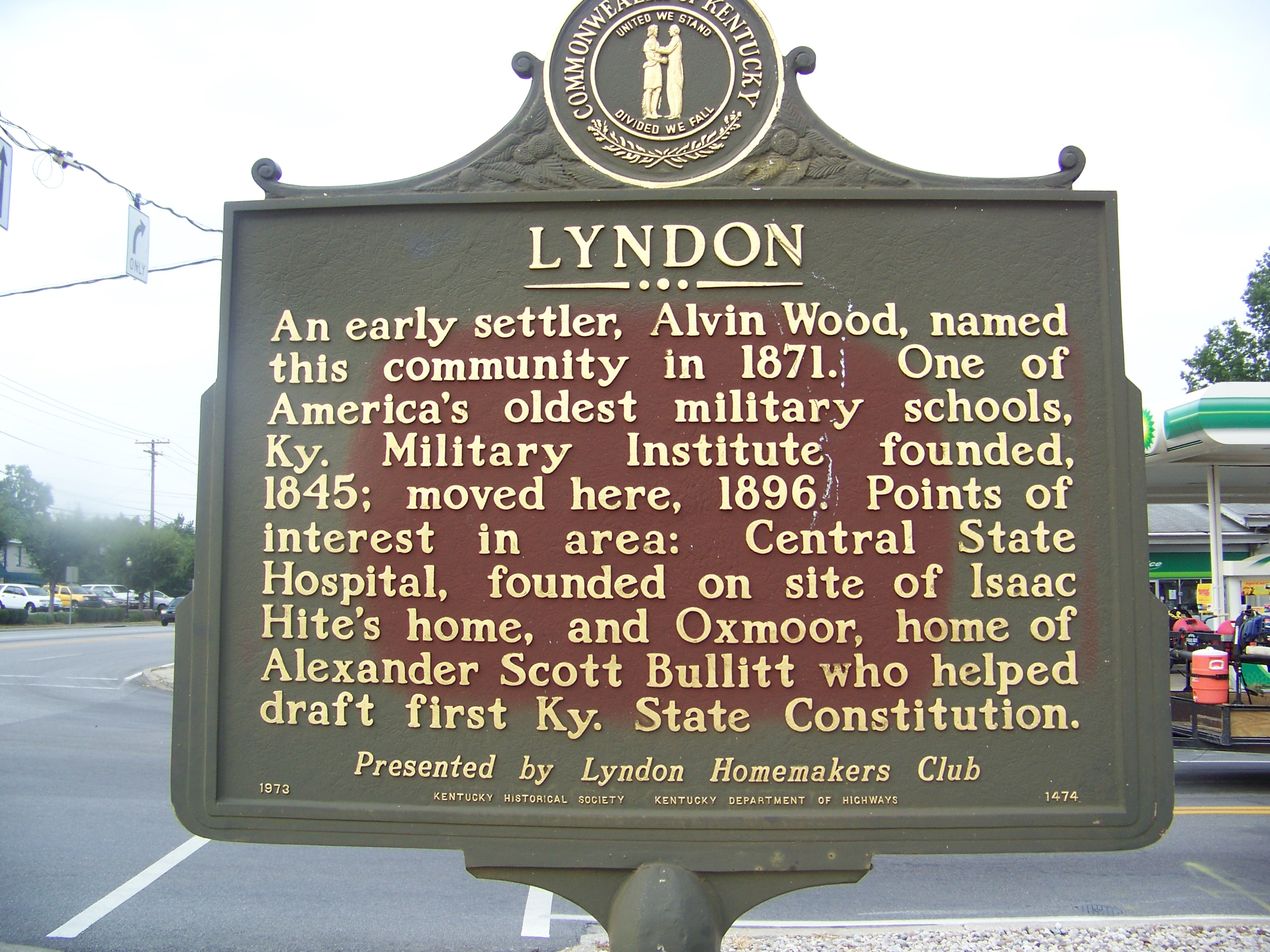
Lyndon historical marker

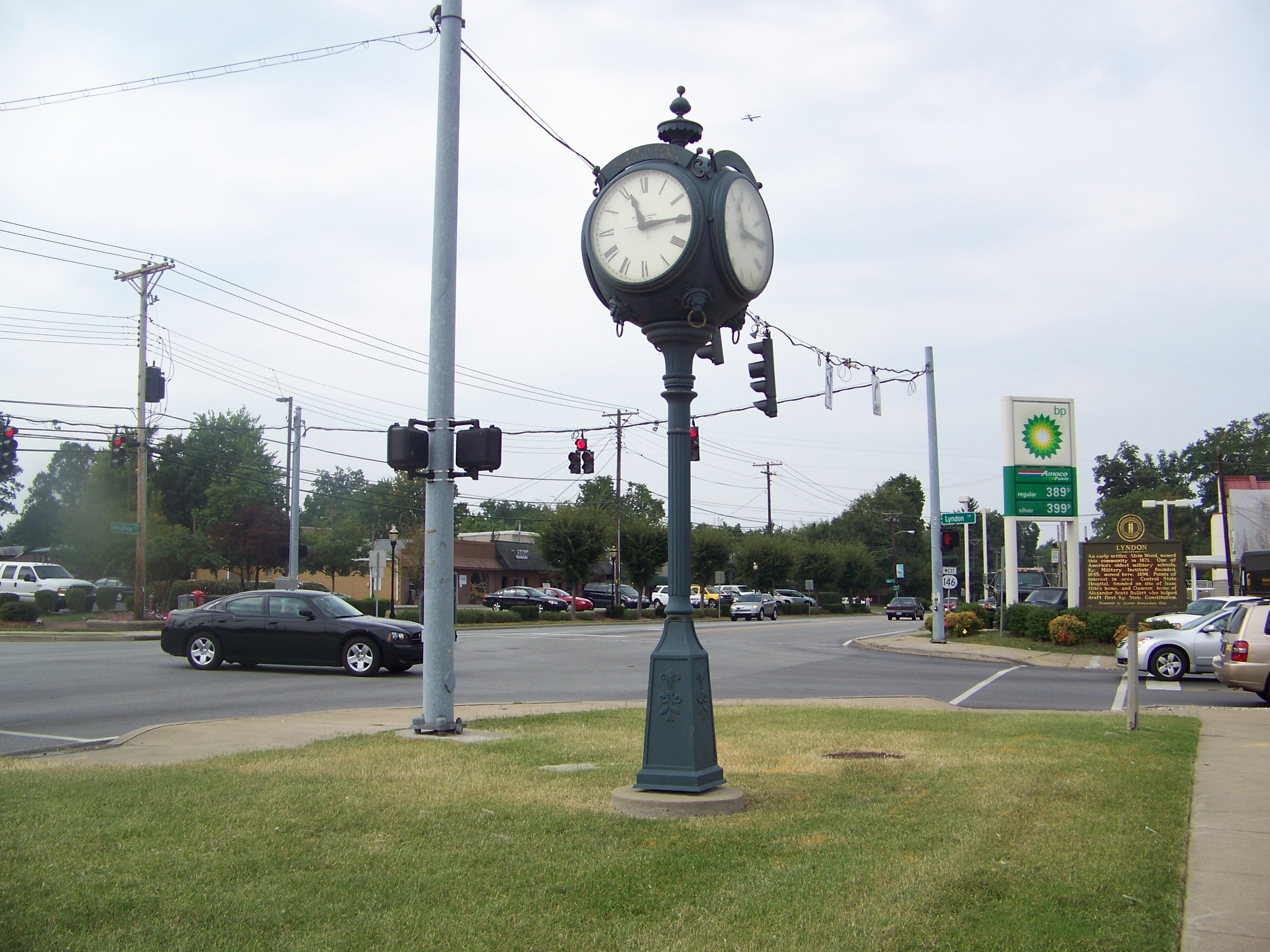
Lyndon Clock

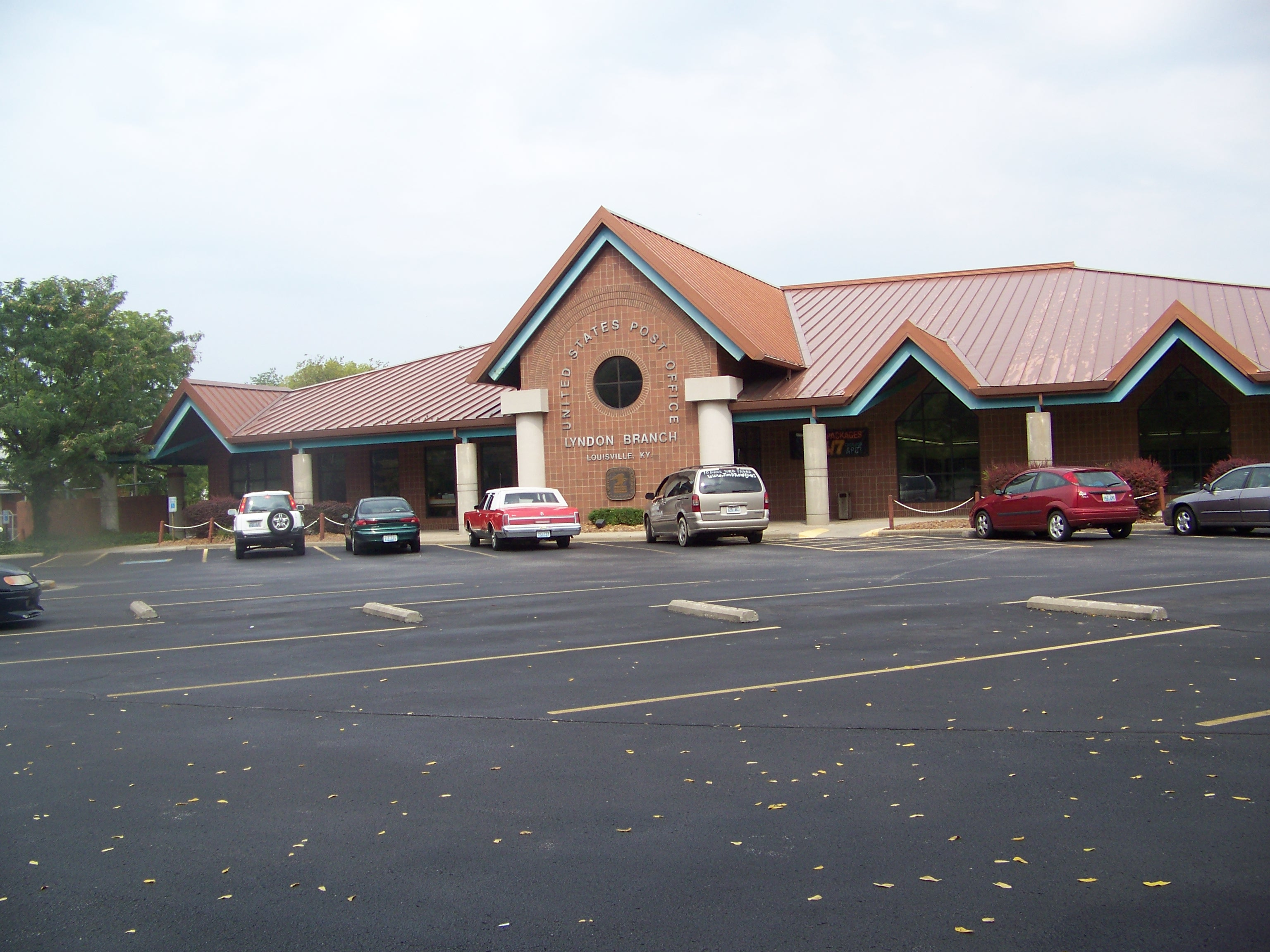
Lyndon Post Office

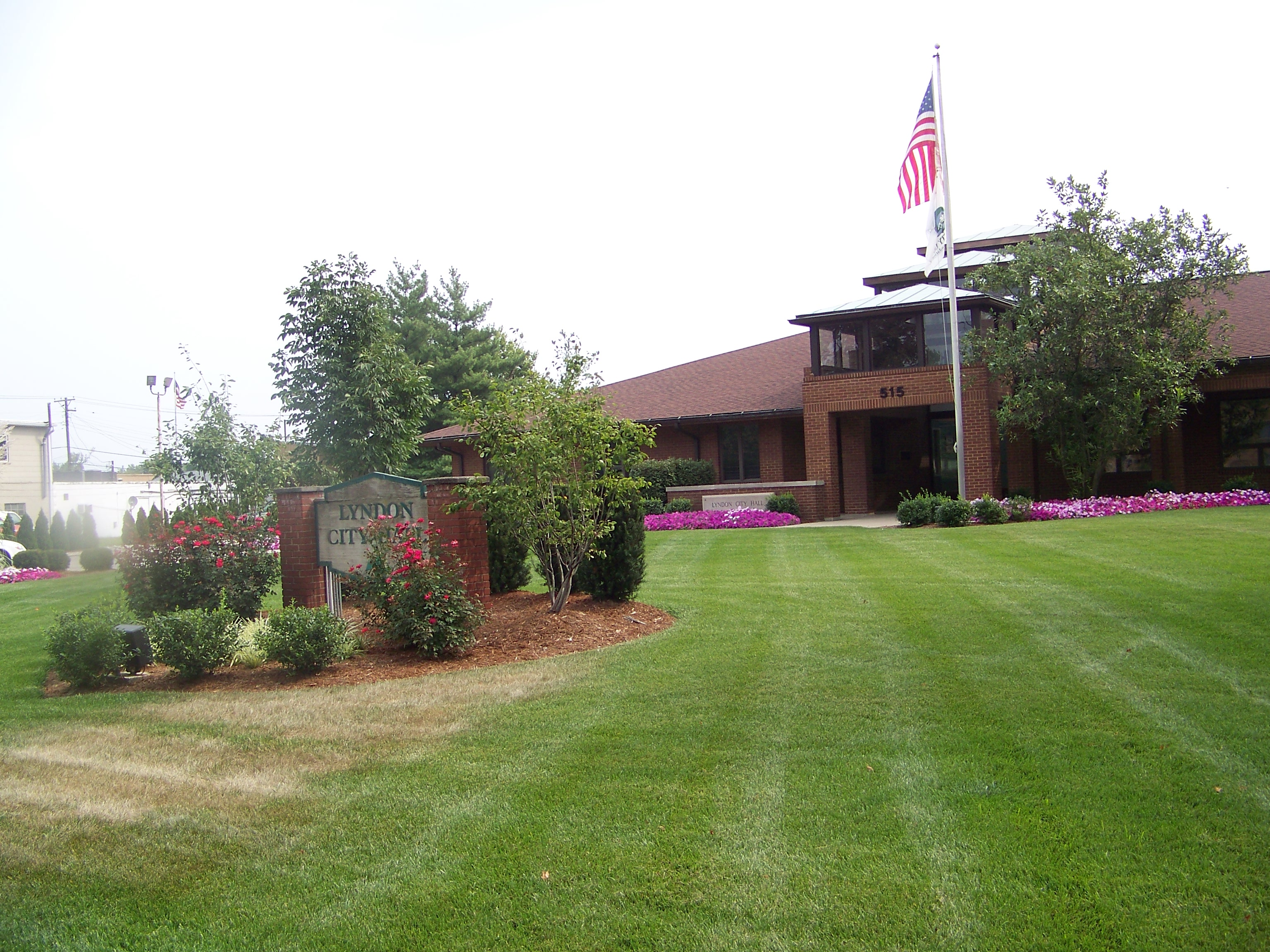
Lyndon City Hall
