= Alvin Hall (disambiguation) =

Alvin Hall (born 1952) is an American financial adviser, author, and media personality.

Alvin Hall may refer to:

- Alvin Hall (defensive back) (born 1934), American football
- Alvin Hall (safety) (born 1958), American football player
- Alvin W. Hall (1888–1969), official in the United States Department of the Treasury
