= Alvin Swen Dixon =

Liberian footballer (born 1993)

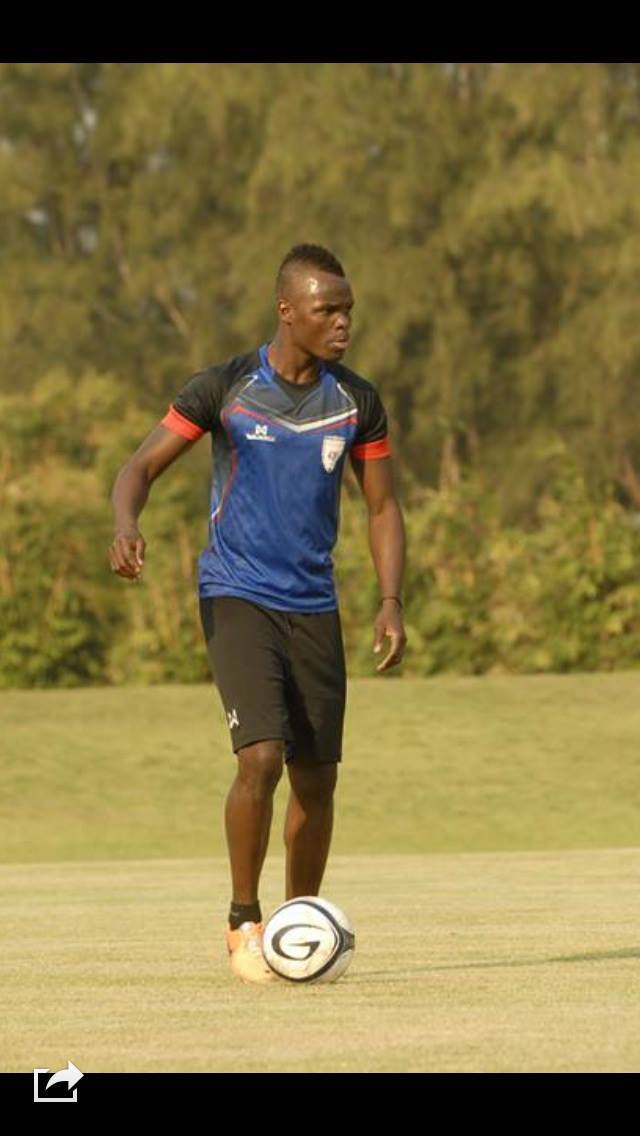

Personal information
- Full name: Alvin Swen Dixon
- Date of birth: 15 March 1993 (age 33)
- Place of birth: Monrovia, Liberia
- Height: 6 ft 2 in (1.88 m)
- Position: Defender

Youth career
- 2008: Telecom FC
- 2009: Telecom FC
- 2010: LPRC Oilers

Senior career*
Years	Team	Apps	(Gls)
2011	LISCR FC	12	(2)
2011	Hapoel Nazareth Illit	12	(0)
2012	LISCR FC	28	(4)
2014	Lanexang United FC	25	(4)
2015	Lao Toyota FC	22	(3)

International career
2012	Liberia	3	(0)
- * Club domestic league appearances and goals

Alvin Dixon (born March 15, 1993) is a Liberian footballer who played as a defender. He played for LISCR FC in 2011 before moving to Israelis side Hapoel Nazareth Illit and in 2014 moved to Asia where he is one of the best defenders in Lao top league for the two half (2\1)seasons. During the 2014 season, Dixon displayed quality with Lane Xang United FC as center back, the season created path for him to sign with Lao Toyota FC.

== Club career ==
Dixon started his youth football with Telecom FC and later joined LPRC Oilers; he was one of the fastest defenders during his days at both clubs. In 2011 he got called to the Liberian national Under-20 national team, signed with LISCR FC in the Liberia top flight and went on to win the championship also appeared in the Confederation of African Football champions League (CAF champions League). In 2012 the center defender Alvin Dixon rejoined his former club LISCR FC in Liberia after playing half season for Hapoel Nazareth Illit in Israel due to serious injury. He was a solid leg for the club during the CAF Champion league fixture against Ghanaian club Berekum Chelsea in both home and away games.

== Award ==
Dixon won the Liberia league championship with LISCR FC in 2012 before moving to Laos in 2014, where he won the championship with Laos Toyota FC in October 2015.

He earned best defender honor during his days in the Liberian league and was rated as one of the best defenders in Laos top league.

== International ==
Dixon played for the Liberian under-20 national team 12 times and the senior side three times.
