= Alvin Levin =

American writer

Alvin Levin (1914–1981) was an American writer from Paterson, New Jersey who grew up in the Bronx.

He is best known for the celebrated unfinished novel, Love is Like Park Avenue, that he began writing in 1936. In 1943 Levin stopped writing entirely, entering a period of silence that ended with his death. A collection of his short fiction (New Directions, 2009) was later given the same title. It primarily deals with the stories of lower-class Jews in New York, as told by a struggling "outsider artist" much like Levin himself.
