= Alvin Valley =

American fashion designer

- Education: University of Miami (BA)
- Occupation: Fashion designer
- Label: Alvin Valley
- Website: AlvinValley.com

Alvin Valley is an American fashion designer. He is frequently referred to as the "King of Pants" due to his widely acclaimed designs in women's pants.
