= Alvin C. Jacobs Jr. =

American documentary photographer

Alvin C. Jacobs, Jr. (born July 6, 1974) is a professional documentary photographer and image activist currently based in Charlotte, North Carolina. He was the 2018-2019 Harvey B. Gantt Center's artist-in-residence after being commissioned to photograph the award-winning images of the exhibition Welcome to Brookhill.

== Early life and career ==
Jacobs was born and raised in Rockford, Illinois.

He got into photography in 2009, after the Rockford police killed 23-year-old Mark Anthony Barmore in the basement of Kingdom Authority International Ministries in Rockford, a church that Jacobs's mother attended. After the killing of Barmore, there was a series of protests, and Jacobs saw neighbors, friends, and family participating. It was the first time there was protest of this magnitude in his community. Jacobs stated he asked himself, “what kind of man would I have been,” during the Civil Rights Movement, and he felt that the camera was a way for him to show resistance.

Jacobs has lived in Dallas, Atlanta, Columbia, Chicago, and San Francisco. He relocated to Charlotte to attend The Art Institute of Charlotte but later left the college feeling that it was not the best fit.

== Activism and notable works ==
Throughout his career, Jacobs traveled to various cities such as Ferguson, Missouri, Minneapolis, Minnesota, New York City, New York, and Charlottesville, Virginia, to document protests. Additionally, he has documented historically African American neighborhoods such as Brookhill in Charlotte.

In addition to social documentary photography, or photo activism, Jacobs collaborated on or was commissioned to take photos for various projects across the nation. These include the NFL, the NBA, and NASCAR. He has provided social commentary via interviews on CNN, HLN, Fox News networks.

From the exhibit of Welcome to Brookhill, he was awarded Charlotte Magazine's 2018 "Charotteans of the Year," Creative Loafing's "Best Photographer of 2018," and the exhibit received top honors by Creative Loafing readers as "Best Exhibit of 2018". Prior to working on the exhibit, the idea for a series of photo documentation of Charlotte's various neighborhoods was already in the works by the staff of Harvey B. Gantt Center. However, after visiting Brookhill, Jacobs expressed he wanted to keep his focus on the neighborhood, after falling in love with the neighborhood. Jacobs wanted people to know the Brookhill Village is just like any other community in Charlotte, and wanted to show people the positive aspects of the neighborhood.

Other notable exhibitions Jacobs has been a part of include: K(NO)W Justice K(NO)W Peace, Levine Museum of the New South, Facing Our Truth, Davidson College, A Queen and Her Crown, University of North Carolina Charlotte and Off the WaterFront.
