= Alvin Jones =

Alvin Jones may refer to:

- Alvin Jones (basketball) (born 1978), Luxembourgish-American professional basketball player
- Alvin Jones (American football) (born 1994), American football linebacker
- Alvin Jones (footballer) (born 1994), Trinidadian association football player
- Alvin Jones (ice hockey) (1917–2007), Canadian professional ice hockey player
- Alvin Jones (musician), American trombonist best known for his work with The Gap Band
