= Alvin Shrier =

Canadian scientist

- Education: Concordia University, Dalhousie University
- Occupations: Professor, Researcher

Alvin Shrier is Professor in the Department of Physiology and holds the Hosmer Chair in Physiology at McGill University in Montreal, Quebec, Canada.

He obtained a Bachelor of Science (B.Sc.) from Concordia University, followed by a Doctor of Philosophy (Ph.D.) from Dalhousie University.

He directs the Cardiac Dynamics Research Laboratory at McGill University.

He was named the Hosmer Chair in Applied Physiology in January 1994.

== Research ==
His research focuses mostly on understanding the functioning and localization of ion channels as they relate to the heart, as well as the initiation of complex cardiac rhythms.
