= Alvin Yeryomin =

Russian economist and politician (1932–2023)

Chairman of the Kostroma Regional Executive Committee
- In office 1986–1990
- Preceded by: Gennady Goryachev
- Succeeded by: Valery Arbuzov

Member of the Supreme Soviet of the Russian SFSR
- In office 1984–1989

Personal details
- Born: Alvin Yevstafyevich Yeryomin; 4 May 1932 Kostroma Oblast, Russian SFSR, USSR
- Died: 15 October 2023 (aged 91)
- Party: CPSU
- Occupation: Economist

Alvin Yevstafyevich Yeryomin (Russian: Альвин Евстафьевич Ерёмин; 4 May 1932 – 15 October 2023) was a Russian economist and politician. A member of the Communist Party of the Soviet Union, he served in the Supreme Soviet of the Russian SFSR from 1984 to 1989.

Yeryomin died on 15 October 2023, at the age of 91.
