= Alvin Wood =

19th-century settler in Kentucky, USA

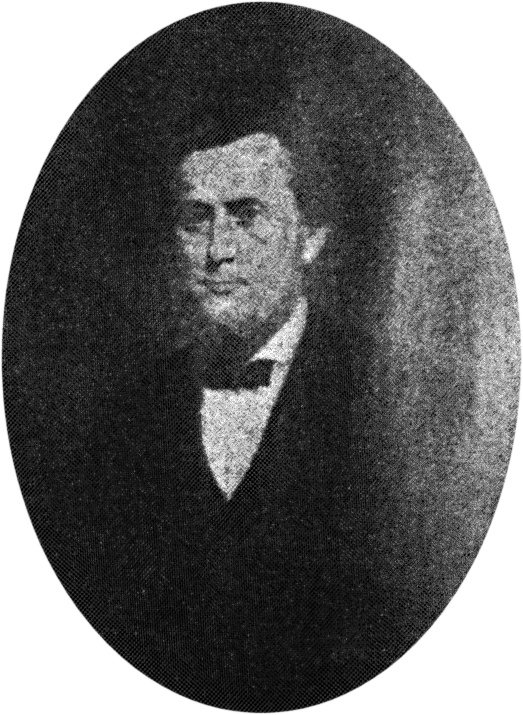
- Alvin Wood
- Born: 1831
- Died: February 7, 1891 (aged 59–60)
- Known for: Early settler in Kentucky
- Spouse: Mary Ellen Rudy
- Children: 2

Alvin Wood (1831–1891) was an early settler in the area that is now the north central part of Jefferson County, Kentucky. He is credited with naming the community of Lyndon, Kentucky, in 1871. The Louisville and Nashville Railroad bordered his land, and Wood built a depot so travelers could catch the train without having to go to Gilman's Point (later known as St. Matthews), several miles away. Wood named the depot "Lyndon" for "Linn's Station," a pioneer fort on nearby Beargrass Creek, built in 1779. Wood affected a portion of the city of Louisville by setting in motion the events that led to the development of the area now known as Lyndon.

Alvin Wood died February 7, 1891, after a week long hospitalization at Anchorage Lunatic Asylum according to The Courier-Journal. He had suffered from rheumatoid arthritis, and had also become delusional at the time of his death. Wood's wife Mary Ellen Rudy Wood survived him, dying on March 11, 1922, while his children, Frances Ola Wood died in 1917, and his son George Rudy Wood died in 1940.

A street in Lyndon bears the name "Wood Road," from the Wood family, who owned the area. This road is mainly residential, but it also contains the Lyndon City Hall and the Jeager Education Center. The Kentucky Historical Society erected a historical marker that references Alvin Wood.

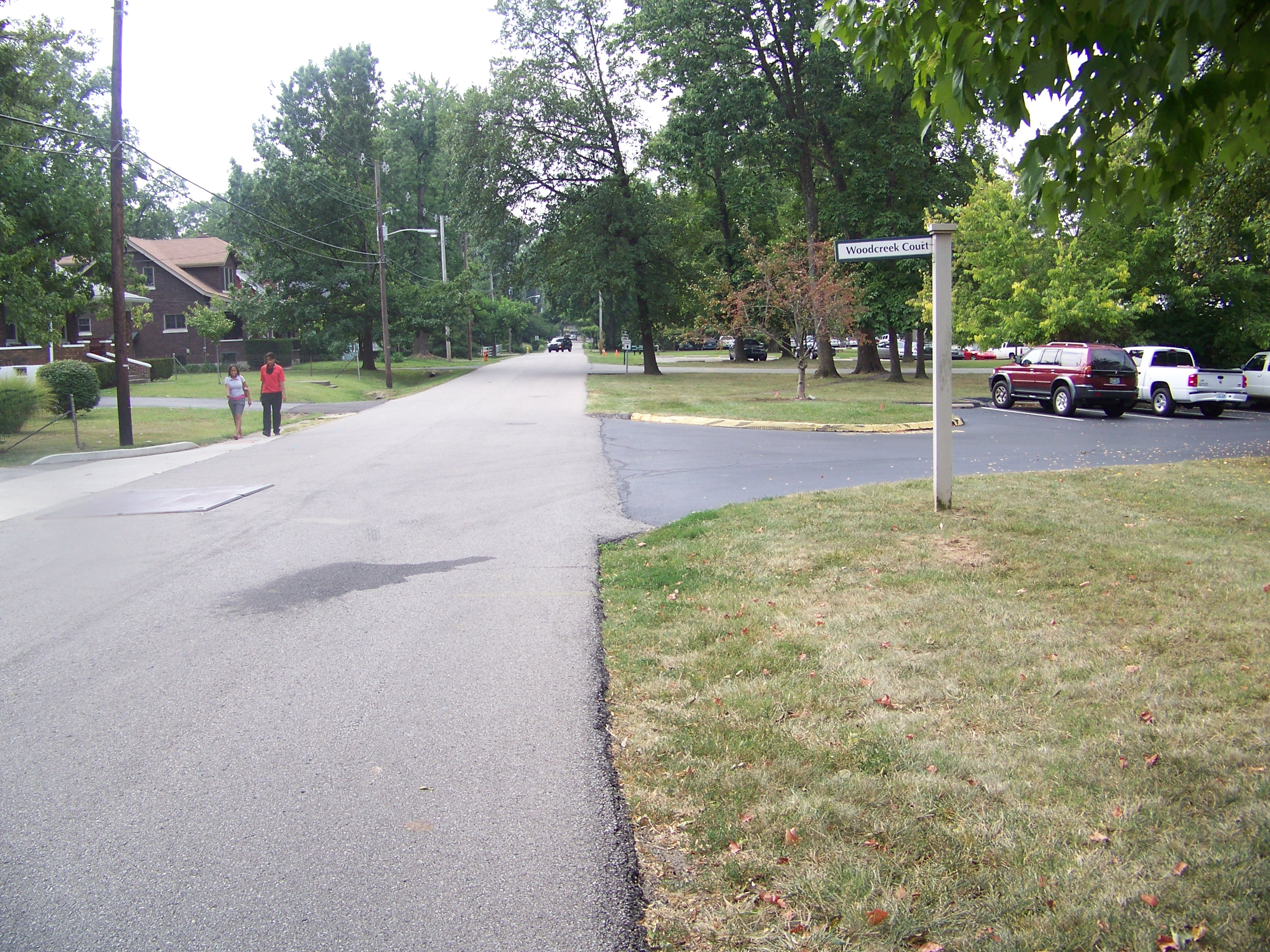
Wood Road

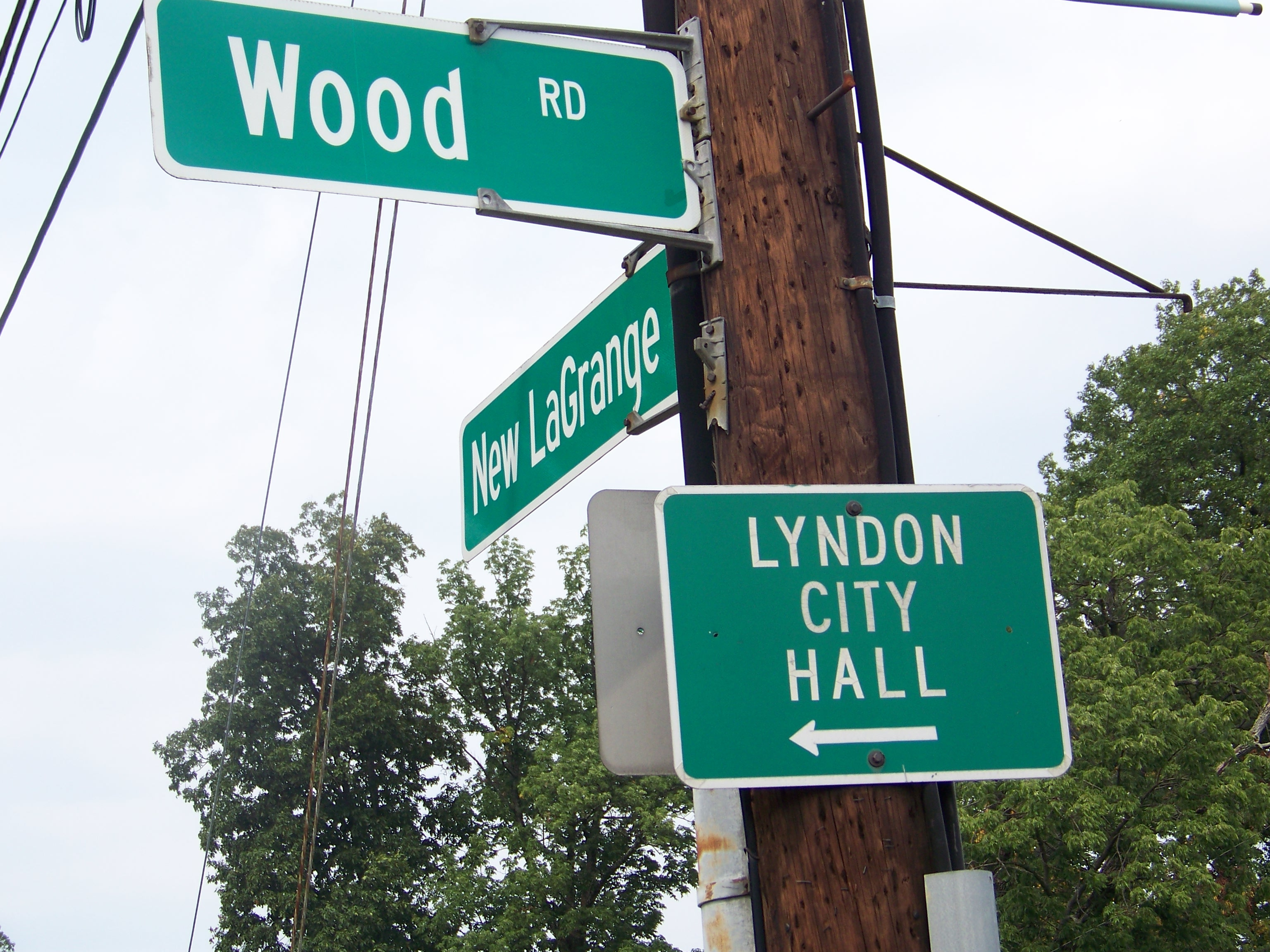
Wood Road sign

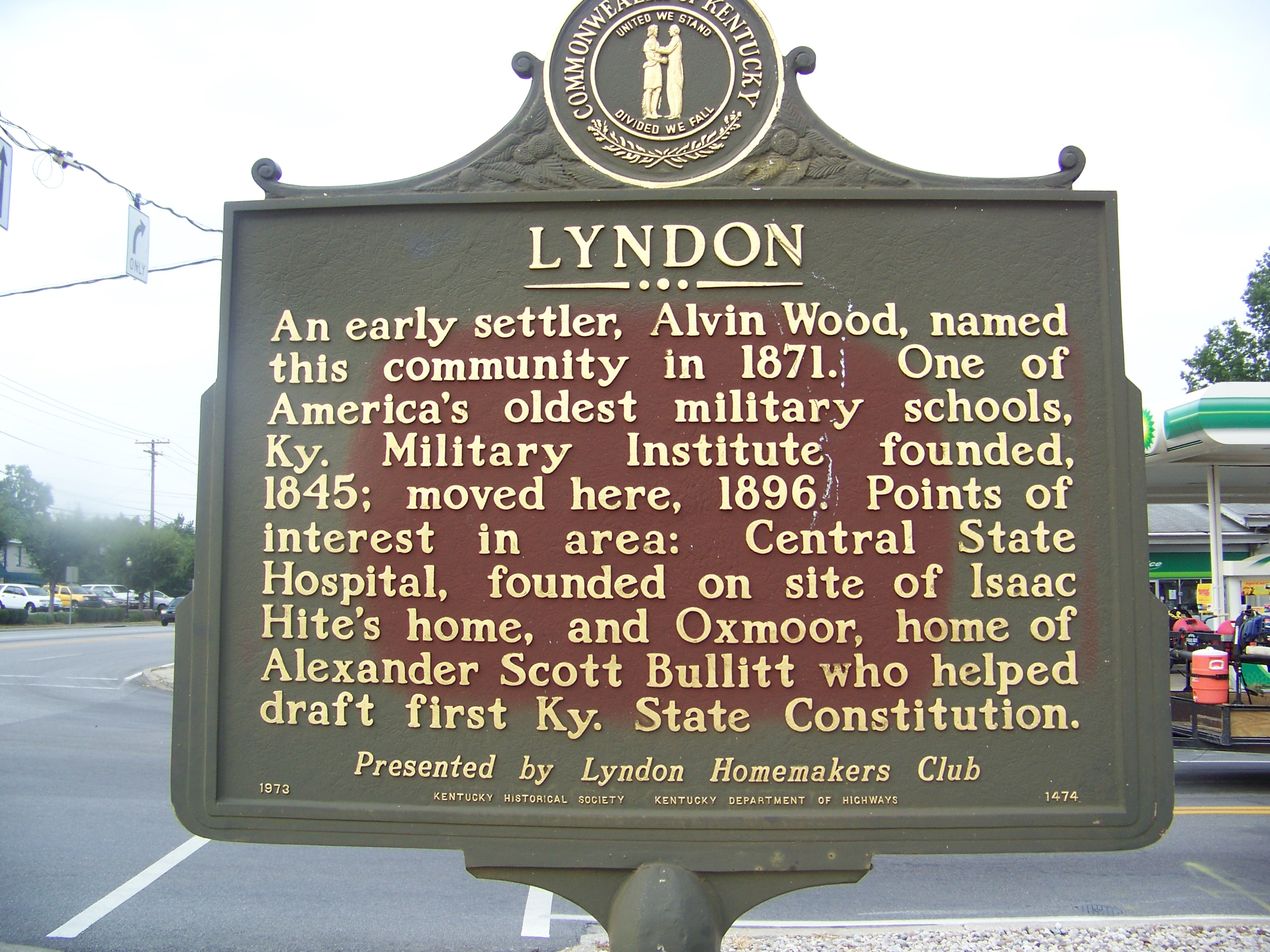
Kentucky historical marker
