= Alvin See =

American politician

Member of the New Hampshire House of Representatives from the Merrimack 26th district
- Incumbent
- Assumed office December 7, 2022
- Succeeded by: Harold Tuttle (elect)

Personal details
- Party: Republican

Alvin See is an American politician. He serves as a Republican member for the Merrimack 26th district of the New Hampshire House of Representatives.
