= Alvin Tan =

Alvin Tan may refer to:

- Alvin Tan (director), Singaporean theatre director
- Alvin Tan (blogger) (born 1988), Malaysian blogger
- Alvin Tan (politician) (born 1980), Singaporean politician
- Alvin Tan (artist) (born 1974), Singaporean artist
