= Alvin Roth (disambiguation) =

Alvin E. Roth (born 1951) is an American academic and Nobel Laureate in Economics.

Alvin Roth may also refer to:

- Alvin Roth (basketball) (1929–2003), American basketball player
- Alvin Roth (bridge) (1914–2007), American bridge player
