= Alvin Taylor (serial killer) =

American serial killer

- Born: Milwaukee, Wisconsin, U.S.
- Conviction: Attempted murder
- Penalty: Involuntary commitment (murders); 20 years imprisonment (attempted murder)

Details
- Victims: 4
- Span of crimes: 1985–1987
- Country: United States
- State: Wisconsin
- Date apprehended: April 3, 1987
- Imprisoned at: Mendota Mental Health Institution, Madison, Wisconsin

Alvin Taylor is an American serial killer who murdered four friends and acquaintances across Wisconsin from 1985 to 1987. Deemed incompetent to stand trial for these crimes, he has been interned in a psychiatric institution and denied parole ever since being institutionalized.

== Early life ==
Very little is known about Taylor's early life. Born in Milwaukee, Wisconsin, he claimed that his parents were indifferent about raising him, often physically assaulted him in order to "discipline" him or left him to wander on the streets. Despite this, the young boy developed a passion for songwriting, meditation and psychotherapy. Beginning in the late 1960s, he tried to build a career as a musician and toured across the Northeastern United States as a soloist for little-known bands. Taylor is believed to have experienced his first psychotic break sometime in 1969, after going to a bar and supposedly overhearing that some men were planning to kill him - even after he left, he claimed that the people on the bus and the maid at a motel were also planning to do the same.

By the mid-1970s, he began to show signs of mental illness that affected him to the point where he was admitted to a hospital, where he was soon diagnosed with schizophrenia. Due to this diagnosis, Taylor spent most of the late 1970s until March 1987 in various psychiatric clinics. In 1980, he was also convicted of delivering crack cocaine in Medford and sentenced to four years imprisonment.

Beginning in the early 1980s, Taylor made a living as a singer and entertainer in nightclubs throughout Wisconsin and Bloomington, Minnesota, but experienced a sharp decline in his mental health. Friends and acquaintances alike characterized him as a religious fanatic and pacifist who, by the late 1980s, had virtually become detached from reality and preferred to live in his own fantasy world.

== Murders ==
Taylor's first known victim was 38-year-old computer company employee Robert L. Williams, a friend he had met in 1984. He eventually started believing that Wiliams had killed someone, which led him to shoot and kill the man on July 15, 1985, with a .357 Magnum, burying the body in the backyard of his rented home in Spring Brook and covering it with quicklime. Williams' remains were not found and exhumed until two years later, when a man who had rented the farmhouse accidentally came across the burial site and informed the police about it.

On May 21, 1986, Taylor stabbed 42-year-old next-door neighbor James A. Severson to death in his apartment in Eau Claire. He later stated that he had stabbed Severson in the neck during the attack, but the blade broke upon impact, whereupon the pair engaged in a fierce struggle. Taylor eventually managed to choke Severson out, after which he took a butcher knife from a kitchen drawer and stabbed him several more times, killing him.

In the fall of 1986, Taylor attended the "Peace Child" musical in Eau Claire, whose goal was to improve relations between the United States and the Soviet Union. While working there, he befriended 27-year-old Timothy Hayden, a custodian for University of Wisconsin–Stout, who later moved in to live with him at the home that Hayden owned, in Menomonie. On March 28, 1987, Taylor shot and killed Hayden inside Hayden's home, using a pistol - the reason for this crime was that after seeing the female model on a calendar that reminded him of Hayden's estranged girlfriend, Taylor started to believe that Hayden had planned to hurt her using a gun he had recently purchased. During the course of the investigation, police determined that the shell casings matched the Williams crime scene, and after interrogating some witnesses, they learned that Taylor had sold such a gun to a man not too long ago. By May 1987, he was charged with the murders of Williams, Severson and Hayden.

After his arrest, Taylor unexpectedly confessed to the murder of 33-year-old Daniel Lundgren, a Minnesota native who was shot and killed on November 30, 1986, in West Bend and then had his body dumped along a road near Jackson. The pair were acquainted, as Taylor lived for a time at the Paradise Inn Village Motel and Chinese Restaurant, where Lundgren was the manager, with the latter being killed because he wanted Taylor to leave. Initially, it was believed that the victim died from injuries sustained in a car accident, as his car had crashed into a culvert. Lundgren was taken to a hospital after being found and given first aid, where he died 30 hours later. Following Taylor's testimony, on June 23, 1987, Lundgren's remains were exhumed and examined, with the forensic report determining that he had been shot three times in the head with a .38 caliber pistol - it remains unclear why this apparently went unnoticed by hospital staff. Due to this, Taylor was charged with this murder in early July 1987.

In addition to the murders, Taylor claimed that he had attempted to kill a man named Paul Zwick at the same motel on December 23, 1986, by striking him with a hammer and stabbing him with a screwdriver. Zwick was later located and, after cooperating with investigators, corroborated Taylor's testimony. He claimed that he had not reported the crime because he enlisted in the Navy and was forced to leave Wisconsin a few days after it had occurred.

Police at one point also questioned Taylor about the murder of 59-year-old Sheldon Kliman, the owner of the Palace Theater in Spooner, who had been stabbed to death in June 1986. However, no charges were ever brought in this case, and he has been presumably cleared of suspicion.

== Аrrest ==
Taylor was arrested on April 3, 1987, while attending Timothy Hayden's funeral in Portage. While investigating the murder, officials located numerous pieces of evidence that implicated Taylor, and he was then booked into the Dunn County Jail with a $750,000 bail. Taylor admitted to the four murders shortly after his arrest, but his sanity was quickly questioned, as he himself claimed to hear voices projected by what he called "The Force" and described himself as a "soldier of God" tasked with killing "evil people" as an undercover police officer. In addition, he suffered from hypochondria and clinical delusions. He seemingly expressed regret for what he had done and stated that he knew he was likely going to prison.

== Trial ==
Taylor was initially scheduled to go to trial for the murders of Williams and Hayden in Dunn County in early 1989, as a judge ruled that he could assist his defense attorneys. However, during one of the court hearings, his lawyer John Kucinski petitioned for a court-appointed mental exam, which was granted. At said exam, Taylor was found to be suffering from paranoid schizophrenia and deemed incompetent to stand trial for the murder charges, but was found guilty and sentenced to 20 years imprisonment on the attempted murder charge. On June 2, the court ordered that he be interned at the Mendota Mental Health Institution in Madison. Kucinski later told in an interview with the media that his client suffered from a severe mental illness and that communication with him during the trial was impossible, noting that he had never encountered such a case before in his legal practice.

== Current status ==
After spending more than 17 years in a psychiatric facility, Taylor asked the Dunn County Court in 2005 to release him, but his request was denied. Five years later, he filed a second petition, but was again denied. In February 2013, he tried yet again, with his attorney arguing that he should not be considered a danger as he had never been violent during his internment, but the facility's staff objected, claiming that Taylor was a high risk patient and had never been transferred to a halfway house. A number of the staff testified that his mental state was too unstable and that he had a propensity to attempt escapes, as he was repeatedly seen checking doors for access to neighboring rooms and clinic buildings. As a result of this testimony, his third request was also denied.

In the fall of 2015, the now-68-year-old Taylor was examined by a special medical board to ascertain his mental state. They concluded that he had improved remarkably, at which point they filed a petition with the Washington County Court of Common Pleas. For this appeal to be successful, it would require approval from the prosecutors' offices in Dunn and Eau Claire Counties, but in September 2016, the Washington County Court denied the petition.

In March 2022, the 75-year-old Taylor again planned to apply for release, but was forced to abandon his plans after a special medical board concluded that his mental health had deteriorated due to his advanced age. As a result, he remains at a psychiatric facility and is still undergoing treatment to this day.

== See also ==
- List of serial killers in the United States
