= Alvin Lie =

Indonesian politician

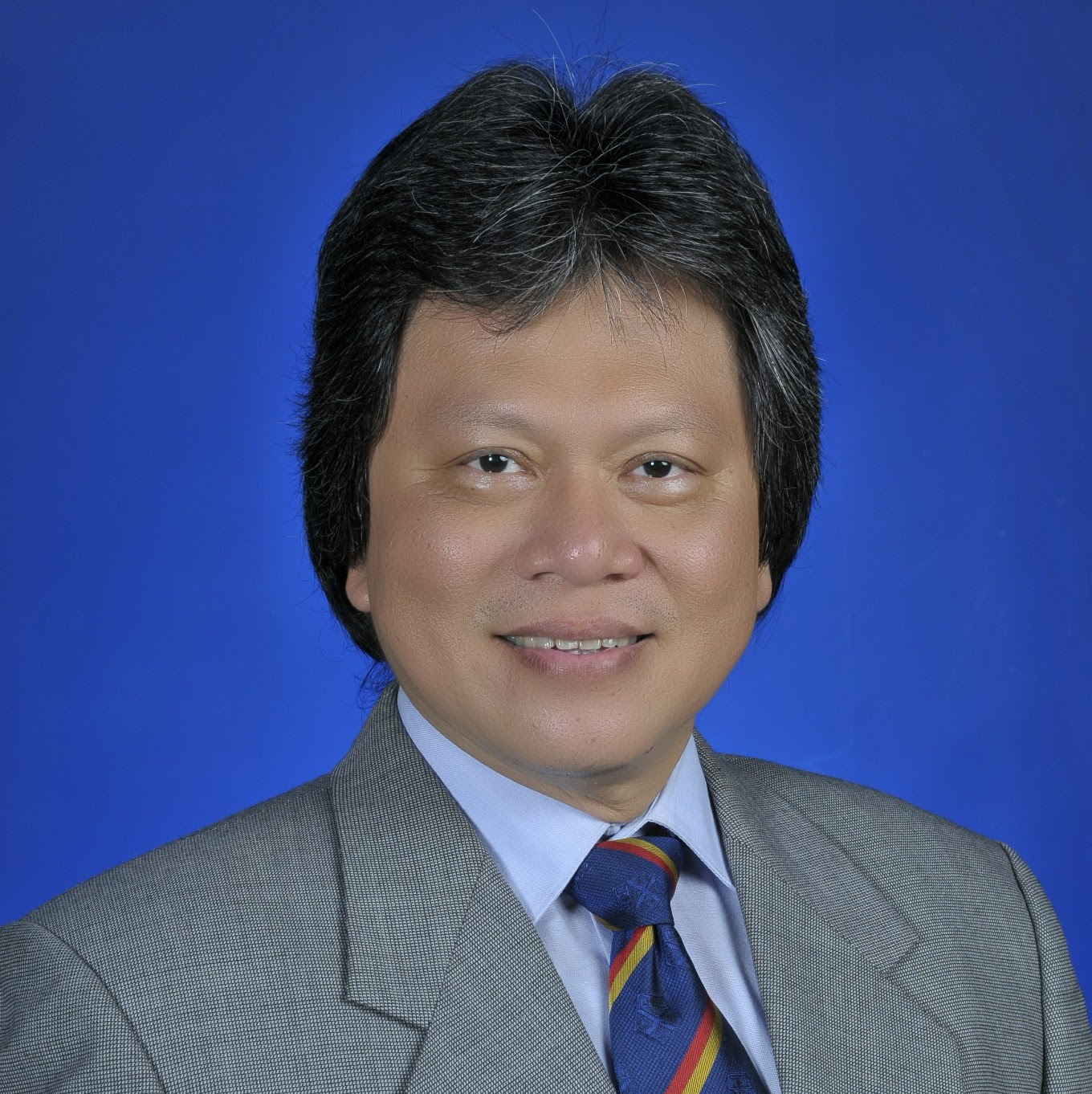

Member of Ombudsman of the Republic of Indonesia
- In office 12 February 2016 – 22 February 2021

Member of the House of Representatives
- In office 1 October 1999 – 30 September 2009
- Constituency: Central Java (1999–2004); Central Java I (2004—09)

Personal details
- Born: Li Ling Piao; April 21, 1961 (age 65) Semarang, Central Java, Indonesia
- Party: Partai Amanat Nasional
- Spouse: Inawati Rahardjo
- Children: 3
- Education: University of Strathclyde; Universitas Diponegoro
- Profession: Politician, Aviation analyst

Alvin Lie, MSc. (Lie Ling Piao, Chinese: 李寧彪) is a member of People's Representative Council of Indonesia (Indonesia: Dewan Perwakilan Rakyat) as the representative of National Mandate Party (Indonesia: Partai Amanat Nasional).

== Early life and career ==
He was born in Semarang, Central Java on 21 April 1961. He spent his school age in Anglo Chinese School, Singapore. He later obtained his master's degree in International Marketing from Stratchclyde University Skotlandia in 1997.

Prior to his political career, he held a position as the director of PT Sarana Sehat Jamu; director of PT Allegori Semarang; director of PT Trans Pacific Trading Semarang, etc.

He is married to Inawati Rahardjo and has 3 children. Currently he lives in Jakarta, Indonesia.
