= Alvin Salehi =

American technology executive

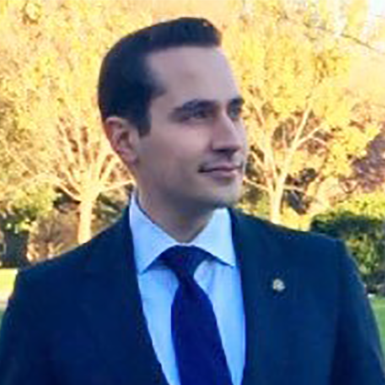
- Salehi at the White House in 2015
- Born: Orange County, California
- Education: Juris Doctor; Master's degree in management Bachelor's degree in political science
- Alma mater: University of Southern California
- Occupations: Entrepreneur; Attorney
- Known for: Founder of Shef and Code.gov; Technology Advisor under President Obama

Alvin Salehi is an American tech entrepreneur, attorney and angel investor. He is the co-founder of Shef, Code.gov and a 2x White House technology advisor under President Obama and President Trump.

== Early life and education ==
Salehi was born and raised in Orange County, California. He graduated from the University of Southern California with a Juris Doctor degree, a master's degree in management, a bachelor's degree in political science, and a bachelor's degree in journalism.

== Career ==
=== Shef ===
In 2019, Salehi launched a venture aimed toward creating meaningful economic opportunities for immigrants and refugees by enabling them to cook and sell food from home. Since launch, Shef has served millions of meals across the United States and helped immigrants and refugees support their families by selling homemade food to their communities. Following COVID-19's impact on the restaurant industry, Shef expanded its mission to include feeding frontline healthcare workers and putting restaurant cooks back to work. As of March 2023, the company has raised more than $100 million in funding from influential investors including Andreessen Horowitz, Y Combinator, Tony Robbins, Katy Perry, Orlando Bloom, Padma Lakshmi, Naval Ravikant, Andre Iguodala, Odell Beckham Jr., and Russell Westbrook.

=== The White House ===
Salehi joined the White House in 2015 as a technology advisor in the Office of the US CIO. He led the development of the nation's first-ever Federal Source Code Policy, which was officially published on August 8, 2016. The policy cuts wasteful taxpayer spending on software acquisitions by mandating that government-funded software be shared across all federal agencies. It also requires that a portion of government code be released to the public as open source software to maximize the economic benefits associated with code sharing and reuse. The draft of the Federal Source Code Policy was recorded as one of the most highly commented White House policies in history.

On November 3, 2016, Salehi launched Code.gov with US CIO Tony Scott during the Obama Administration, and subsequently led its regulatory enforcement under the Trump Administration. Since then, Code.gov has become the nation's primary platform for sharing and improving government code, boasting a large collection of reusable software projects from dozens of federal agencies and organizations. Notable examples include a reusable Facebook Messenger bot built by the Executive Office of the President, a comprehensive web analytics tool built by GSA, and an intuitive tracking application built by the Pentagon for a NATO mission in Afghanistan—all of which Salehi has discussed in keynote presentations around the country.

=== Harvard Law School ===
On July 13, 2017, Salehi was appointed by Harvard University to serve as a research affiliate at the law school's Berkman Klein Center for Internet & Society. His research focuses on the impact of open source software on code security, economic efficiency, and technological innovation.

=== Previous Work ===
Prior to joining the White House, Salehi helped "lead the State Department’s efforts to expand Internet access to Africa and improve global market access for US technology companies. He also served at the Advanced Research Projects Agency, which invests in transformative, cutting-edge technologies on behalf of the federal government."

== Recognition ==
=== Forbes 30 Under 30 ===
In November 2017, Salehi was named to Forbes 30 Under 30. Forbes recognized Salehi for his tech policy work for the architecture of the Federal Source Code Policy and launching the US government's Code.gov platform.

=== World's 100 Most Influential ===
In November 2018, Salehi was included in Apolitical's list of the World's 100 Most Influential Young People in Government. He was listed in the top 20 alongside Congresswoman Alexandria Ocasio-Cortez and Congresswoman Elise Stefanik.

=== Refugee Work ===
In April 2018, Salehi was appointed as a Millennium Fellow at the Atlantic Council. Since joining, he has met with Syrian refugees and political leaders in Turkey and Greece to discuss pathways toward resolving the refugee crisis in Europe and the Middle East. Additionally, he has taken an active role in determining how technology can be used most effectively to resolve humanitarian crises, calling for increased cross-country collaboration and global crowdsourcing as a means to identifying solutions quickly. In July 2018, Salehi spoke at the NATO Summit in Brussels, stating that “sharing and collaboration is the key to remaining competitive in the digital age.”

== Trivia ==
=== White House Fence Jumper ===
On May 2, 2016, Salehi was featured in the Washington Post for stopping a robbery near the White House. According to the article, Salehi was en route to a meeting when he saw a man wrestle a woman to the ground and steal her purse. Salehi charged at the man, forcing him to retreat and run toward the fence surrounding the White House. The man scaled the fence and jumped into the complex. As Secret Service officers made their arrest, Salehi retrieved the purse and handed it back to the woman.
