= Alvin Hart =

Alvin Hart may refer to:

- Alvin Youngblood Hart (born 1963), American musician
- Alvin N. Hart (1804–1874), American jurist and politician in Michigan
