= Alvin McDonald =

American caver and tour guide

Alvin Frank McDonald (1873 – December 15, 1893) was an early American caver and tour guide at what became Wind Cave National Park in South Dakota, the sixth-longest cave system in the world, from 1889 to 1893.

From the age of 16 until his death at the age of 20, McDonald discovered and mapped the first 8 to 10 miles (13 to 16 km) of Wind Cave using candlelight. His exploration and mapping was so extensive and thorough for the time that it was not until 1963, 70 years after his death, that major new passageways were discovered in Wind Cave.

== Early life ==
McDonald was born in Franklin County, Iowa, and moved to Wind Cave, in the Black Hills of South Dakota, in 1890. His father, Jesse D. McDonald, had been hired in 1889 by the South Dakota Mining Company to oversee the company's "mining claim". It is not known if the mining company expected to find minerals of value in the cave or just planned on developing it for tourism. Regardless, the McDonald family eventually decided to attempt to make a living from the cave by developing it with enlarged passageways and wooden ladders and steps, with the hope of attracting travelers from the nearby resort town of Hot Springs.

== Wind Cave exploration ==
Alvin McDonald fell in love with Wind Cave, and in the few years he lived there he systematically explored about 8 to 10 miles (13 to 16 km) of its subterranean passageways. He kept a journal in which he described his exploration of the cave and the naming of the rooms and passageways. McDonald explored the cave entirely by candlelight and rolled out string to mark his way out of the cave. He shared his passion for the cave with visitors by becoming, in his own words, "the chief guide" at Wind Cave. Several of the modern tours offered by the National Park Service through the cave follow McDonald's original tour routes.

McDonald spent many hours almost every day for more than three years exploring and guiding within the cave. He was known to explore newly discovered passageways during his tours as well as on his own. Once, after being out of the cave for two days due to an illness, he wrote in his journal, "am homesick for the cave". He quickly realized the complex nature of the cave and wrote in his journal, "have given up the idea of finding the end of Wind Cave". Though he appreciated the beauty and natural features of the cave, McDonald, like others of his era, often removed samples of cave formations to sell to visitors. He would only remove samples from the cave in areas where he did not take visitors.

== Death ==
McDonald died of typhoid fever at the age of 20, on December 15, 1893. It is believed he contracted the disease in Chicago, where he had been promoting the cave and exhibiting samples at the Columbian Exposition the previous summer. Some people have speculated that continued exposure to the cool, damp air of the cave caused him to yield to complications from the typhoid.

McDonald was buried near the entrance to the cave he loved so dearly. A bronze plaque on a stone marks his grave, which is located on a hill above the natural entrance to Wind Cave, 200 yards (180 m) north of the park's visitor center. Photographs of Alvin McDonald, mementos, and his original journal are on display in the lower exhibit room of the visitor center.

== Legacy ==
Alvin McDonald's exploration of Wind Cave and eagerness to share it with others likely contributed to the creation and development of Wind Cave National Park, the seventh national park in the United States, in 1903.

It is assumed that there are areas of Wind Cave that McDonald explored that no one else has since visited. Occasionally pieces of McDonald's string are discovered by survey teams in Wind Cave. As recently as August 2009, McDonald's signature was discovered carved into the ceiling of a room in the cave where it had been assumed no person had ever visited. The signature was dated July 1893, making it the latest known dated signature left by Alvin McDonald in Wind Cave.
