= Alvin Wolfe =

American anthropologist (1928–2024)

Alvin William Wolfe (March 1, 1928 – June 25, 2024) was an American anthropologist, a Distinguished University Professor Emeritus from University of South Florida, and an Elected Fellow of the American Association for the Advancement of Science. Wolfe was born on March 1, 1928, and died on June 25, 2024, at the age of 96.
