= Alvin Francis Lindsay =

American politician

Alvin Francis Lindsay, Sr.

Member of the Missouri House of Representatives from the Scott County district
- In office 1925–1927

Personal details
- Born: February 3, 1882 Grayville, Illinois, U.S.
- Died: May 9, 1957 Sikeston, Missouri, U.S.
- Party: Republican
- Spouse: Halla Taylor (1917-1957)
- Education: Southern Illinois State Teachers Normal Carbondale; Chicago School of Architecture
- Occupation: architect, teacher, city planner

Alvin Francis Lindsay, Sr. (February 3, 1882 – May 9, 1957) was an American politician from Scott County, Missouri, who served in the Missouri House of Representatives. He was the son of carpenter and merchant John S. Lindsay and Maggie B. Record Lindsay who was originally from Indiana. He worked as an architect in the states of Missouri, Illinois, Kentucky, and Tennessee. Lindsay died in 1957 at Sikeston's Missouri Delta Community Hospital.

His son Alvin Francis Lindsay, Jr. was chairman of Roure Bertrand Dupont, a perfume supplier from Teaneck, New Jersey.
