= Alvin Jackson =

Alvin Jackson may refer to:

- Alvin Ray Jackson (born 1980), American arena football linebacker
- Alvin B. Jackson, American politician from Utah
- Alvin Jackson (musician), jazz bassist
- Alvin Jackson (historian), University of Edinburgh historian of Britain and Ireland
