= Alvin T. Amaral =

American politician

Member of the Hawaii House of Representatives
- In office 1973–1976

Personal details
- Born: December 1, 1927 Puʻunene, Hawaii, U.S.
- Died: November 18, 2014 (aged 86)
- Party: Republican
- Spouse: Dorothy Amaral
- Children: 3

Alvin T. Amaral (December 1, 1927 – November 18, 2014) was an American politician. He served as a Republican member of the Hawaii House of Representatives.

== Life and career ==
Amaral was born in Puʻunene, Hawaii. He was a councilman in Maui.

In 1973, Amaral was elected to the Hawaii House of Representatives, serving until 1976.

Amaral died in November 2014, at the age of 86.
