= Alvin White =

Alvin White may refer to:

- Alvin S. White (1918–2006), American test pilot and mechanical engineer.
- Alvin White (American football) (born 1953), gridiron football quarterback and punter
