= Alvin B. Cardwell =

American experimental physicist

Alvin Boyd Cardwell (October 16, 1902, Oral, Roane County, Tennessee – September 8, 1992, Kingston, Tennessee) was an American experimental physicist, specializing in "thermionic and photoelectric emission of electrons from crystalline metals."

== Biography ==
A. B. Cardwell graduated in 1925 with a bachelor's degree from the University of Chattanooga. At the University of Wisconsin–Madison he graduated in physics with an M.S. in 1927 and a Ph.D. in 1930. His Ph.D. thesis was published in the Proceedings of the National Academy of Sciences. In December 1930 in Roane County, Tennessee, he married Edna Evangeline Zirkle. At Tulane University he was an assistant professor from 1930 to 1935 and an associate professor from 1935 to 1936. In January 1936 he was elected a Fellow of the American Physical Society.

At Kansas State University (KSU) he was the head of the physics department from 1936 to 1944 and from 1946 to 1952. From 1944 to 1946 he was on leave absence to work on the Manhattan Project in Oak Ridge, Tennessee. During the late 1930s until his departure from Kansas in 1944 he was the volunteer weather observer for the United States Weather Bureau. From April 1939 to 1944 the official weather station was in the backyard of Alvin and Edna Cardwell's home at 1928 Humboldt Street in Manhattan, Kansas.

After WW II, as head of KSU's physics department, Cardwell hired several young physicists with doctoral degrees. These physicists established physics research at KSU and in the late 1940s the department was authorized to grant M.S. and Ph.D. degrees.

From 1952 to 1955 Cardwell was an associate dean in KSU's School of Arts & Sciences. In 1955 an illness made him incapable of continuing as associate dean. Upon his recovery he returned to the physics department and in 1957 resumed the departmental headship, continuing in that capacity until 1967. He remained a faculty member until 1972 when he retired as professor emeritus. In 1972, he and his wife returned to Tennessee. The couple had two children.

In the 1950s, A. B. lobbied to get Physics a building in which it would be the main tenant (at that time, Physics shared Willard Hall with Chemistry). He oversaw all aspects of the design and construction of the new building that opened in 1963 which, later and fittingly, was named Cardwell Hall in his honor.
In 1956 Cardwell was named as the Distinguished Graduate Faculty member at KSU. He was the third person to receive this honor. In 1960 his undergraduate alma mater, now the University of Tennessee at Chattanooga, awarded him an honorary Doctor of Sciences degree.

== Selected publications ==
- Cardwell, Alvin B. (1928). "The Photo-Electric and Thermionic Properties of Iron". Proceedings of the National Academy of Sciences. 14 (6): 439–445. Bibcode:1928PNAS...14..439C. doi:10.1073/pnas.14.6.439. PMC 1085553. PMID 16577125.
- —— (1929). "Effects of a Crystallographic Transformation on the Photoelectric and Thermionic Emission from Cobalt". Proceedings of the National Academy of Sciences. 15 (7): 544–551. Bibcode:1929PNAS...15..544C. doi:10.1073/pnas.15.7.544. PMC 522504. PMID 16587489.
- —— (1931). "Photoelectric and Thermionic Emission from Cobalt". Physical Review. 38 (11): 2033–2040. Bibcode:1931PhRv...38.2033C. doi:10.1103/PhysRev.38.2033.
- —— (1931). "The Photoelectric Properties of Tantalum". Physical Review. 38 (11): 2041–2048. Bibcode:1931PhRv...38.2041C. doi:10.1103/PhysRev.38.2041.
- —— (1935). "The Thermionic Properties of Tantalum". Physical Review. 47 (8): 628–630. Bibcode:1935PhRv...47..628C. doi:10.1103/PhysRev.47.628.
- —— (1942). "A Novel Method of Contact Photography". American Journal of Physics. 10 (3): 147–149. Bibcode:1942AmJPh..10..147C. doi:10.1119/1.1990347.
- —— (1949). "Photoelectric and Thermionic Properties of Nickel". Physical Review. 76 (1): 125–127. Bibcode:1949PhRv...76..125C. doi:10.1103/PhysRev.76.125.
- —— (1953). "Photoelectric Studies of Iron". Physical Review. 92 (3): 554–556. Bibcode:1953PhRv...92..554C. doi:10.1103/PhysRev.92.554.
- Fry, R. K.; —— (1962). "Photoelectric Properties of Natural Uranium and Changes Occurring at Crystallographic Transformations". Physical Review. 125 (2): 471–474. Bibcode:1962PhRv..125..471F. doi:10.1103/PhysRev.125.471.
