= Alvin Pankhurst =

New Zealand magic realist artist (1949–2024)

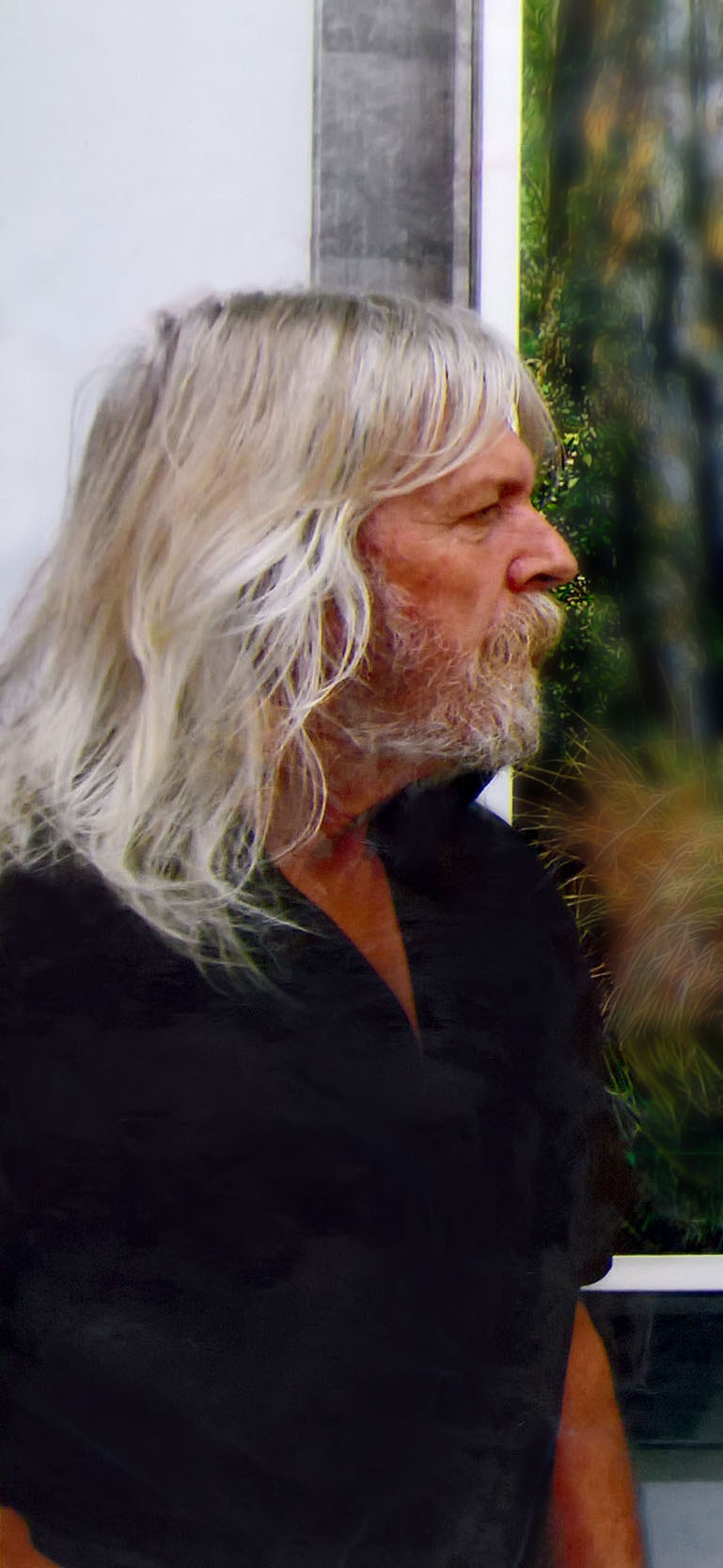
- Pankhurst in 2017
- Born: 16 November 1949; Carterton, New Zealand
- Died: 26 September 2024 (aged 74)
- Known for: Painting
- Movement: Realist, surrealist
- Spouse: Ephra Pankhurst

Alvin Ernest Pankhurst (16 November 1949 – 26 September 2024) was a New Zealand magic realist artist. He was the owner of two galleries of his art in the Auckland suburb of Parnell and at Pauanui on the Coromandel Peninsula.

Born in Carterton, Pankhurst became a full-time artist in 1969, starting with the Young Contemporaries Touring Exhibition and the finals of the 1970 National Benson & Hedges Art Competition. Pankhurst won the 1974 Benson & Hedges Art Award with the large tempera on board work Maybe Tomorrow, which was bought by the Dunedin Public Art Gallery.

Pankhurst lived in Auckland, and died on 26 September 2024, at the age of 74.

== Major exhibitions ==
- 2001 Royal Academy of Arts summer exhibition 2001. The 233rd.
- 2019 8th Beijing Art Biennale – NZ Special Exhibition, Beijing International Art Biennale
