= Alvin Kelly =

Alvin Kelly may refer to:

- Alvin "Shipwreck" Kelly (1893–1952), American pole-sitter
- Alvin Andrew Kelly (1951–2008), American serial killer
