= Alvin Saldaña =

Chilean politician

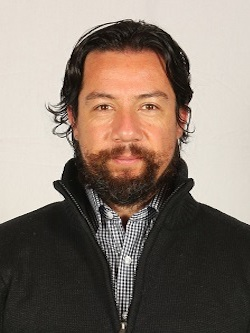

Member of the Constitutional Convention
- In office 4 July 2021 – 4 July 2022
- Constituency: 15th District

Personal details
- Born: 5 July 1976 (age 50) Rengo, Chile
- Party: Independent
- Education: Diego Portales University (LL.B); University of Santiago, Chile (PdG)
- Occupation: Constituent
- Profession: Lawyer

Alvin Saldaña Muñoz (born 5 July 1976) is a Chilean lawyer and independent politician. He served as a member of the Constitutional Convention, representing the 15th electoral district of the O'Higgins Region.

== Biography ==
Saldaña Muñoz was born on 5 July 1976 in Santiago. He is the son of Alvin Hernán Saldaña Abarca and Lucía Angélica Muñoz Sandoval.

He studied law at Diego Portales University (UDP) between 1994 and 1999, qualifying as a lawyer. He later completed a postgraduate diploma in Education for Sustainability at the University of Santiago. In 2015, he trained as a Gestalt therapist at the Claudio Naranjo school.

Since 2001, he has worked as a lawyer at Alvin Saldaña y Cía Abogados Ltda. He later served as legal advisor to the Municipality of Peumo between 2008 and 2016.

== Political career ==
In 2014, he began participating in the Movement for Water and Territories (MAT). Two years later, he joined the Network for Food Sovereignty and the NGO Tejiendo Ecologías.

In the elections held on 15–16 May 2021, he ran as an independent candidate for the Constitutional Convention representing the 15th electoral district of the O'Higgins Region as part of the Autonomous Social Movements electoral pact, receiving 8,870 votes (4.90% of the validly cast votes).
