= Alvin P. Carey =

United States Army Medal of Honor recipient

- Born: August 16, 1916; Lycippus, Pennsylvania, U.S.
- Died: August 23, 1944 (aged 28) near Plougastel, Brittany, France
- Burial place: Ligonier Valley Cemetery, Ligonier, Pennsylvania
- Military career
- Allegiance: United States of America
- Branch: United States Army
- Service years: 1941–1944
- Rank: Staff Sergeant
- Units: 38th Infantry, 2nd Infantry Division
- Conflicts: World War II
- Awards: Medal of Honor

Alvin P. Carey (August 16, 1916 – August 23, 1944) was a soldier in the United States Army who received the Medal of Honor for actions during World War II in France. He joined the Army from Laughlinstown, Pennsylvania, in January 1941.

== Medal of Honor citation ==
Rank and organization: Staff Sergeant, U.S. Army, 38th Infantry, 2nd Infantry Division. Place and date: Near Plougastel, Brittany, France, August 23, 1944. Entered service at: Laughlinstown, Pa. Born: August 16, 1916, Lycippus, Pa. G.O. No.: 37, May 11, 1945.

Citation:

For conspicuous gallantry and intrepidity at the risk of his life, above and beyond the call of duty, on August 23, 1944. S/Sgt. Carey, leader of a machinegun section, was advancing with his company in the attack on the strongly held enemy hill 154, near Plougastel, Brittany, France. The advance was held up when the attacking units were pinned down by intense enemy machinegun fire from a pillbox 200 yards up the hill. From his position covering the right flank, S/Sgt. Carey displaced his guns to an advanced position and then, upon his own initiative, armed himself with as many hand grenades as he could carry and without regard for his personal safety started alone up the hill toward the pillbox. Crawling forward under its withering fire, he proceeded 150 yards when he met a German rifleman whom he killed with his carbine. Continuing his steady forward movement until he reached grenade-throwing distance, he hurled his grenades at the pillbox opening in the face of intense enemy fire which wounded him mortally. Undaunted, he gathered his strength and continued his grenade attack until one entered and exploded within the pillbox, killing the occupants and putting their guns out of action. Inspired by S/Sgt. Carey's heroic act, the riflemen quickly occupied the position and overpowered the remaining enemy resistance in the vicinity.

== Legacy ==
Ligonier Valley High School near Pittsburgh, Pennsylvania was renamed the Alvin P. Carey School in 1998. Carey was also inducted into the Hall of Valor for Allegheny County, PA in 2005. After the war, his body was brought back to the United States and is interred in the Ligonier Valley Cemetery.

== See also ==
- List of Medal of Honor recipients
- List of Medal of Honor recipients for World War II
