= Alvin Karadža =

Bosnian-Herzegovinian footballer

Personal information
- Date of birth: 28 May 1984 (age 42)
- Place of birth: Bugojno, SFR Yugoslavia
- Height: 1.91 m (6 ft 3 in)
- Position: Central defender

Senior career*
Years	Team	Apps	(Gls)
2004–2008	Zrinjski	53	(2)
2008–2009	Šibenik	18	(0)
2010	Sloboda Tuzla	12	(0)
2011	Zvijezda	8	(0)
2011	Travnik	2	(0)
2012	Iskra Bugojno		
2012–2015	Kupres		
- * Club domestic league appearances and goals as of 27 March 2021

Alvin Karadža (born 28 May 1984) is a Bosnian-Herzegovinian footballer who plays for FK Sloboda Tuzla in the Bosnian Premier League.

Karadža previously played for HNK Šibenik in the Croatian Prva HNL.
