= Alvin J. Salkind =

American chemical engineer (1927–2015)

- Born: June 12, 1927; New York City, New York
- Died: June 9, 2015 (aged 87); New Brunswick, New Jersey
- Known for: Contributions to battery technology and biomedical research
- Notable work: Alkaline Storage Batteries, Techniques of Electrochemistry
- Spouse: Marion Koenig Salkind (b. 1932)
- Children: Susanne J. Salkind (b. 1968) James A. Salkind (b. 1970)
- Parent: Samuel M. Salkind (1897–1965) Florence Zins Salkind (1897–1984)

Alvin J. Salkind (/ˈsælkaɪnd/; June 12, 1927 – June 9, 2015) was an American chemical engineer. Salkind is known for writing the seminal texts Alkaline Storage Batteries with S. Uno Falk and making tremendous gains in the area of battery. Among his many scientific contributions, Salkind was the first to build a battery into an x-ray port tracking structure with state of charge. In 2005, Salkind was named to the College of Fellows of the American Institute for Medical and Biological Engineering. In 2014, he became a fellow of the Electrochemical Society.

== Education ==
Salkind received his PhD in chemical engineering from Polytechnic Institute (Poly), where he underwent interdisciplinary training with minors in both electrochemistry and x-ray physics. During his time at Poly, his research focused on nickel-cadmium batteries and related battery technology.

== Career ==
From industry to academia, Salkind has touched may aspects of science in his career.

- Polytechnic Institute, Professor
- Electric Storage Battery Company, President
- Rutgers University, Professor of Surgery/Bioengineering
- Case Western Reserve University, Yeager Center, Executive Director

== Achievements ==
Among his most prominent works, Salkind co-authored both Alkaline Storage Batteries and Techniques of Electrochemistry Vol. 1–3 with S. Uno Falk and Ernest Yeager respectively. He was also the first to monitor the state of condition of lead-acid batteries used in utility networks. Further, he resolved the structure of AgO using neutron diffraction.

Salkind edited over 17 books, authored over 200 peer-reviewed articles, and has over two dozen patents.
