= Alvin Abdul Halim =

Indonesian footballer

Personal information
- Full name: Alvin Abdul Halim Nasution
- Date of birth: 15 August 1998 (age 28)
- Place of birth: Bireuën, Indonesia
- Height: 1.77 m (5 ft 10 in)
- Position: Central midfielder

Youth career
- 2017: Juang FC
- 2018: Kuala Nanggroe
- 2020–2021: PON Aceh

Senior career*
Years	Team	Apps	(Gls)
2019	Aceh Utara		
2019	Persilatama Takengon		
2019	Peusangan Raya		
2021–2022	Persiraja Banda Aceh	16	(0)
2022	Sriwijaya	4	(0)
2023	Persiraja Banda Aceh	1	(0)
- * Club domestic league appearances and goals as of 17 September 2023

Alvin Abdul Halim Nasution (born 15 August 1998) is an Indonesian professional footballer who plays as a central midfielder.

== Club career ==
=== Persiraja Banda Aceh ===
He was signed for Persiraja Banda Aceh to play in the Liga 1 in the 2021 season. Alvin made his league debut on 7 January 2022 in a match against PSS Sleman at the Ngurah Rai Stadium, Denpasar.
