= Alvin Schwartz =

Alvin Schwartz may refer to:

- Alvin Schwartz (comics) (1916–2011), American comic-book writer
- Alvin Schwartz (children's author) (1927–1992), American author and illustrator of children's books
