= Alvin Goldfarb =

10th President of Western Illinois University

10th President of Western Illinois University
- In office July 1, 2002 – June 30, 2011
- Succeeded by: Jack Thomas

Personal details
- Education: Queens College (BA); Hunter College (MA); City College of New York (PhD)

Alvin "Al" Goldfarb is an American academic administrator who served as the tenth president of Western Illinois University from 2002 to 2011. From 1977 to 2002, he was on the faculty of the department of theatre at Illinois State University in Normal, where he was also chair of the theatre department, dean of fine arts from 1988 to 1998, and provost and vice president for academic affairs from 1998 to 2002.

== Education ==
Goldfarb earned a Bachelor of Arts in Theatre Arts and Mass Communication from Queens College, City University of New York. He then earned a Master of Arts in Theatre and Cinema from Hunter College and a Ph.D. in theater history from the City College of New York.

== Career ==
Goldfarb began his career as a theatre history professor at Illinois State University in Normal, IL. Students in the department named the superlative awards for the theatre department, akin to Broadway's Tony Awards, the Goldfarb awards. At Illinois State University, Goldfarb was involved in establishing an internship program with the Steppenwolf Theatre Company and constructing new center for the performing arts.

Goldfarb became the president of Western Illinois University in 2002. In 2006, Goldfarb announced that he was being treated for prostate cancer and that a complete recovery was expected. At the July 2009 meeting of the WIU board of trustees, Goldfarb officially announced his intention to retire on June 30, 2011. It was announced that President Goldfarb would be succeeded as president of the university by Western's provost and vice president for academic affairs, Jack Thomas, who succeeded him on July 1, 2011. In 2026, Western Illinois constructed and named a new performing arts center after Goldfarb.

Goldfarb has researched and written extensively on the arts and on the Holocaust, of which his parents are survivors. He co-edited and contributed to the book Holocaust and Performance, and, with Rebecca Rovit, he co-edited the book Theatrical performance during the Holocaust: texts, documents, memoirs (Baltimore : Johns Hopkins University Press, 1999. ISBN 0-8018-6167-5).

=== Textbooks ===
He has written several widely used university textbooks on theater jointly with Edwin Wilson, a former Broadway theatre critic for The Wall Street Journal and Dr. Megan Geigner, a theatre historian and professor at Northwestern University.

- Living Theatre : A History of Global Theatres,
  - 2nd edition. New York : McGraw-Hill, c1994. ISBN 0-07-070733-2 (alk. paper)
  - 3rd edition ISBN 0-07-038469-X
  - 8th edition, New York: W.W. Norton & Company, ISBN 978-1-324-07313-0
- Anthology of Living Theater,
  - 1st edition, Boston: McGraw-Hill, c1998. ISBN 0-07-070774-X
  - 2nd edition. Boston: McGraw-Hill, c2001. ISBN 0-07-231729-9
  - 3rd edition. ISBN 978-0-07-351413-0
- Theater: the Lively Art
  - 1st edition, 1991, ISBN 0-07-070734-0
  - 4th edition, 2002, ISBN 0-07-240718-2
  - 6th edition, forthcoming, ISBN 978-0-07-351411-6
  - 2024 edition, ISBN 978-1-266-30279-4
- The Theatre Experience
