= Alvin Maccornell =

Liberian footballer

Personal information
- Date of birth: 13 January 1993 (age 33)
- Height: 1.82 m (6 ft 0 in)
- Position: Center-back

Team information
- Current team: Al-Diwaniya

Senior career*
Years	Team	Apps	(Gls)
–2012	LISCR FC		
2013–2014	Red Lions		
2015–2016	Barrack Young Controllers		
2016–2017	FC Fassell		
2018–2022	LPRC Oilers		
2021–2022	Watanga FC		
2022–	Al-Diwaniya		

International career^{‡}
2013–	Liberia	15	(0)
- * Club domestic league appearances and goals as of 16:07, 17 March 2022 (UTC) ‡ National team caps and goals as of 15:59, 17 March 2022 (UTC)

Alvin Maccornell (born 13 January 1993) is a Liberian footballer who plays as a center-back for Iraqi side Al-Diwaniya.
