= Alvin K. C. Ng =

Hong Kong jockey

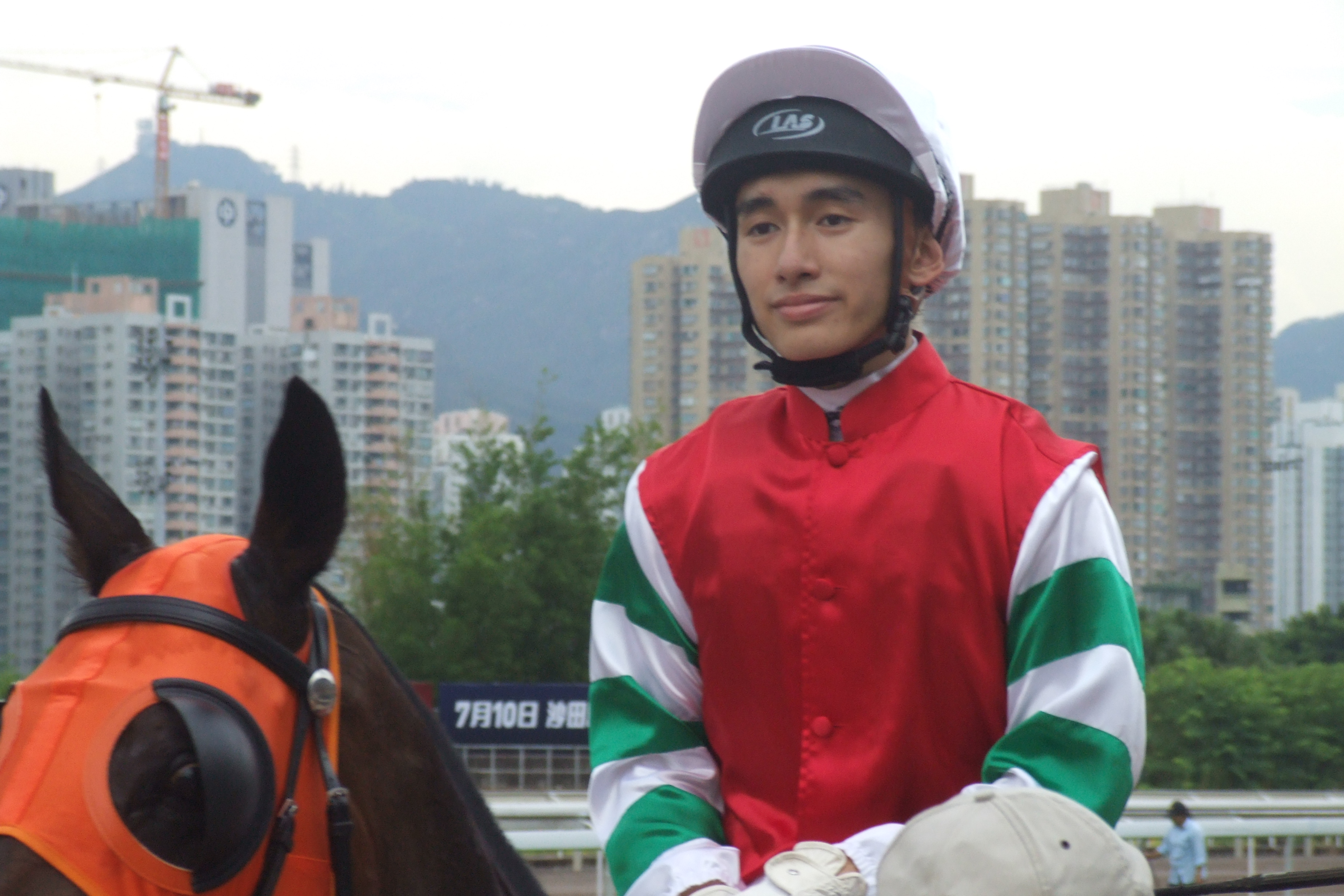
Alvin K. C. Ng

Alvin K. C. Ng (born 17 October 1989) has been an apprentice jockey since July 2008. He rides for the Hong Kong Jockey Club.

In late 2011, Ng won 7 races of 43. He added 20 wins in the 2011/12 season, and in 2012/13 he won another 20 races in an unsuccessful bid for the apprentice jockeys' title. He took his Hong Kong career total to 49 with 2 wins in the 2013/14 season.

== Career totals ==
Seasons	Total Rides	No. of Wins	No. of 2nds	No. of 3rds	No. of 4ths	Stakes won
2010/2011	43	7	3	3	5	HK$4,666,250
