= Alvin Mitchell =

Alvin Mitchell may refer to:

- Alvin Mitchell (defensive back) (born 1943), American football player
- Alvin Mitchell (running back) (born 1964), American football player
