= Alvin Dueck =

American psychologist and theologian

Alvin Dueck (born 1943) is an American psychologist and theologian, currently Distinguished Professor of Cultural Psychology at Fuller Theological Seminary.
