= Alvin Moore =

Alvin Moore may refer to:

- Alvin Moore (equestrian) (1891–1972), American horse rider
- Alvin Moore (American football) (born 1959), American football running back
- Alvin Head Moore (1838–1911), Canadian politician
