= Alvin Joseph Downing =

American jazz musician

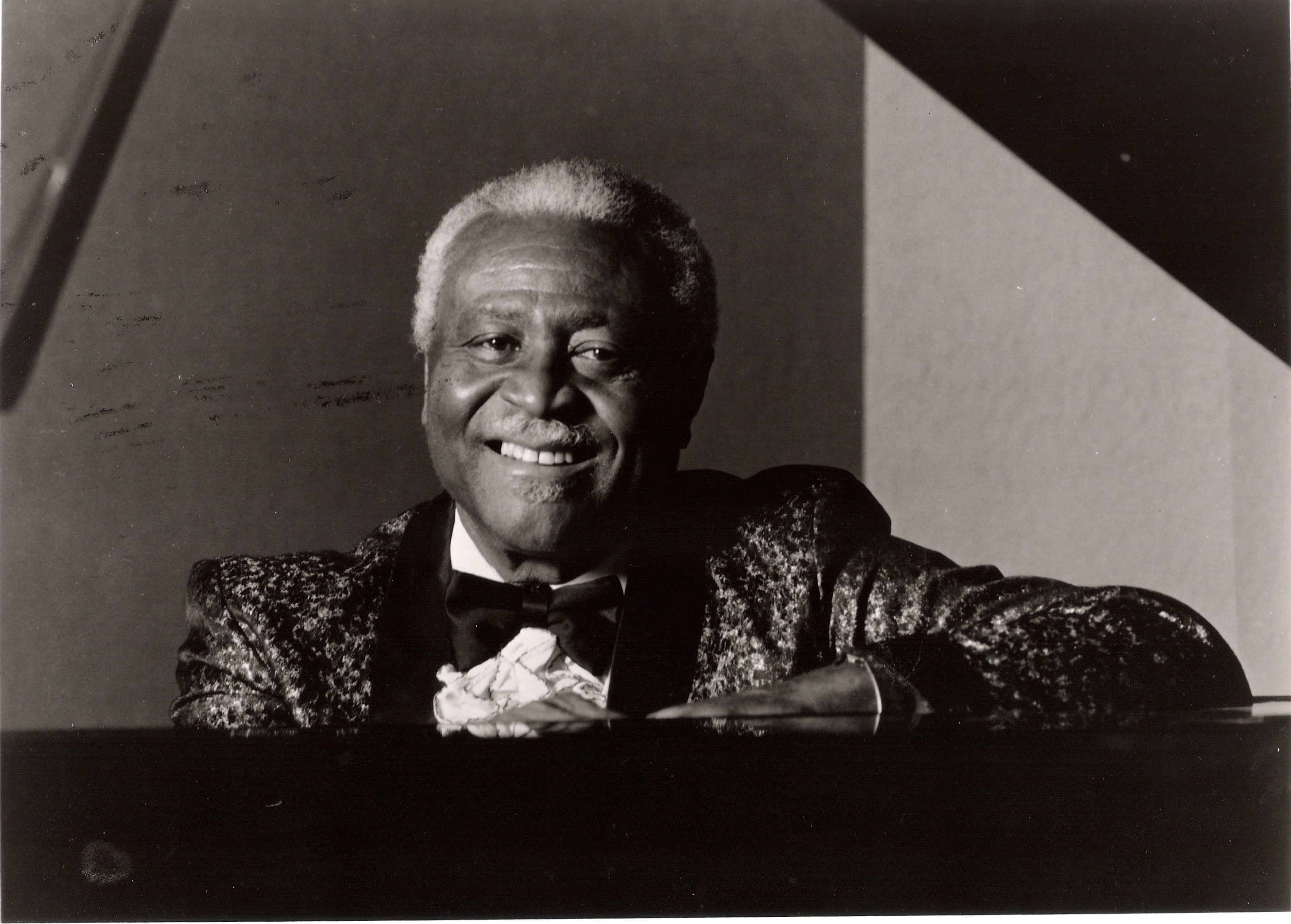
Alvin Joseph Downing at the piano

Alvin Joseph Downing (1916–2000) was the founder of the Al Downing Tampa Bay Jazz Association. An influential jazz musician and teacher, Downing made significant contributions to the African-American jazz community in Florida. He became the first African-American Commissioner of the St. Petersburg Housing Authority in Florida, as well as the first African American to play in the St. Petersburg Symphony Orchestra.

== Early life ==
Downing was born in 1916 in Jacksonville, Florida, the middle child of Ernest and Mary Downing. His father, a railroad porter and street musician, and his mother, a seamstress, adhered to their idea of the American dream and pushed for the best life they could provide for their family, developing a close kinship with one another and a high reverence for the Baptist faith.

He had an affinity and curiosity for music from a very young age. His relationship with the piano that later led to his love of jazz developed when his cousin, who had been taking piano lessons, convinced him to practice the piano in her place. After his parents discovered the switch, they acquired a piano and arranged lessons for him at the age of five.

Downing continued his lessons throughout elementary and middle school, and in the beginning of his high school years he organized his first band, The Ten Clouds of Joy. After graduating from high school, he chose to attend Alabama State College, later transferring to Florida Agricultural & Mechanical College, where he met his future wife Bernice "Bunny" Gause. After graduating from college, Downing moved to St. Petersburg, Florida, where he began his teaching career at Gibbs High School, the African American high school of the community. Downing taught at Gibbs for three years before he was drafted into the United States Army Air Force (USAAF), the United States' aviation appendage during World War II. Upon returning from the war, he taught music at St. Petersburg College Clearwater Campus for many years while playing local clubs.

Downing continued to play the piano throughout his lifetime up until dying of heart failure in 2000.

== Military ==
Al's deployment formally formed the 332nd Fighter Group and the 447th Bombardment Group, but history would remember these groups as the Tuskegee Airmen. The Tuskegee Airmen were the first-ever African American pilots of the military, and those that comprised this group, although understandably apprehensive about the idea of war, were excited by the idea of African American pilots.

Stationed at the Tuskegee Army Airfield, also known as Sharpe Field and a predominantly black base, in Tuskegee, Alabama, with Bunny back home in St. Petersburg, Al qualified for flight school, but a medical examination designated him "grounded" due to asthma. Ever resourceful as the military is, however, Al was made use of as a clerk in the offices of the command center. Not content with being a clerk, Al applied for officer training and in 1944 completed officer candidate school, making him a Lieutenant.

Shortly after becoming a Lieutenant, he was made the adjutant of the 613th Air Force Band. However, when the Tuskegee Army Airfield was closed, Al was transferred to Lockbourne Air Base and was shortly thereafter promoted to squadron commander and leader of the 613th Army Air Force Band. He was responsible for organizing a musical program to "establish a good working relationship" with the white citizens of Columbus, Ohio, and stymie their disdain for the newly transferred Tuskegee Airmen, whom they regarded as trouble makers after the highly gossiped Freeman Field confrontation, a series of incidents where Tuskegee Airmen, stationed at Freeman Army Airfield, attempted to integrate an all-white officers' club, which resulted in multiple arrests of African American officers.

As a solution, Al created a talent show that required one squadron to entertain a different squadron every week. This proved to be successful and, with the help of Private First Class Calvin Manuel, a professional actor before entering the service, a variety show was created called Operation Enjoyment. Operation Enjoyment was so successful that "Colonel Joseph F. Goetz, chief of the entertainment section of the USAF [...] persuaded the Air Force to sponsor it on a tour of bases throughout the United States." The show consisted of magic and comedic acts, dancing, singing, and ended with a "thrilling piano battle between Private First Class [Ivory] Mitchel and Lieutenant Al Downing, in which the entire cast sang the Army Air Corps song, 'Into The Wild Blue Yonder'".

Though he enjoyed his service to his country, his passion for music was his true calling. After 21 years of service and reaching the rank of Major through his work for the 613th Air Force Band, Al officially retired from the military in 1961 and returned to St. Petersburg. He reestablished his teaching career at Gibbs Junior College, now St. Petersburg College, where he taught piano, organ, music theory, brass, woodwind, instrumental percussion techniques, and applied music courses.

== The All Stars ==
After returning to St. Petersburg, Al was approached by Ernie Calhoun, the leader of a local jazz band named "Ernie Calhoun and the Soul Brothers". Ernie offered Al a job as the organist for his band, and Al accepted. The abilities of a good organist were highly sought after in the musical community in the 1960s. Al's organ of choice, a B-3 Hammond, increased his value as everyone wanted a B-3 Hammond. The partnership established between Al and Ernie helped introduce Al to the extensive network of local musicians.

Shortly after joining "Ernie Calhoun and the Soul Brothers", Al started his own band "The All Stars", which consisted of a wide array of musical talents of different ages, musical backgrounds, and race, but with a common interest in jazz. For Al, it wasn't about who you were, what color you were, or what religion you were; it was about what instrument you played. This lack of racial boundaries in Al's musical world helped bridge a few gaps in the musical community, ultimately adding to the promotion of integration.

== Al Downing Tampa Bay Jazz Association ==
In 1971, the integration of white and black schools was initiated countywide in Pinellas County, and though this eliminated, to some degree, racial boundaries in education and networking, there were still very few outlets in the community for jazz. Though there were many job opportunities for musicians, jazz was seemingly getting snuffed out. Al's newly formulated band, "The All Stars", saw the deficiency of jazz firsthand, and to help bring new life to jazz, Al started the "Allegro Music Society".

The Allegro Music Society, although passionately pursued, was shortly disassembled as political pressure from the local musician's union discouraged membership in the Allegro Music Society and threatened the survival of local bands, as the union was, in essence, a band's accreditation at the time. Most clubs would not hire a band without the backing of the local musicians union. Still passionate about creating outlets for jazz musicians, Al reorganized a concept for another organization that would keep jazz alive for both prospective and current musicians and reintroduce people to the golden days of jazz. The result was the formation of the Al Downing Florida Jazz Association in 1981.

Unlike the Allegro Music Society, the Al Downing Florida Jazz Association was successful in formulating a functional and sustainable association that provided outlets for jazz musicians as well as education opportunities for those who wanted to learn about jazz. In 1984, the Al Downing Florida Jazz Association absorbed the Tampa Bay Jazz Society, creating one entity for the advancement of jazz. When the two organizations merged, the proposition to drop the Al Downing name from the title was quickly rebuked and denied, as it was clear that Al Downing was truly the "Ambassador of Jazz", a title given to him by the Clearwater Jazz Holiday Foundation.
