= Ælfwine =

Ælfwine (also Aelfwine, Elfwine) is an Old English personal name. It is composed of the elements ælf "elf" and wine "friend", continuing a hypothetical Common Germanic given name *albi-winiz which is also continued in Old High German and Lombardic as Albewin, Alpwin, Albuin, Alboin. Old Norse forms of the name are Alfvin and Ǫlfun. The modern name Alwin/Alvin may be a reduction of this name, or alternatively of Adalwin, the Old High German cognate of the Anglo-Saxon Æthelwine. The name of the elves is clearly of Common Germanic age. As an element in given names, it is not found in the earliest period, but it is well attested from the 6th century and extinct by the Late Middle Ages.

== Etymology ==
The ælf and the wine element are frequent elements in Germanic anthroponymy, and these elements have in historical practice been combined without a compound meaning, though the name is often interpreted as "elf-friend". This translation was notably made use of by J. R. R. Tolkien in his legendarium, where an Ælfwine is a character who "befriended the elves".

The name continues a hypothetical Common Germanic given name *albi-winiz which is also continued in Old High German and Lombardic as Albewin, Alpwin, Albuin, Alboin. Old Norse forms of the name are Alfvin and Ǫlfun. The modern name Alwin may be a reduction of this name, or alternatively of Adalwin, the Old High German cognate of the Anglo-Saxon Æthelwine.

== Middle Ages ==
The name of the elves is clearly of Common Germanic age. As an element in given names, it is not found in the earliest period, but it is well attested from the 6th century.

The name is first attested as that of Alboin (r. 560–572), king of the Lombards. In Anglo-Saxon England, it first occurs with the child-king Ælfwine of Deira (c. 661 - 679). The Old High German name is found in the 8th and 9th centuries in the forms Alfwin, Alfwini, Albuwin, Albuvin, Albewin, Albuin, Alpwin, in the 11th century also as Elbewin. The forms in alf are strictly speaking Low German, the forms in alb High German. The Old English ælf, elf are a result of the i-mutation in North Sea Germanic.

People with this name from the later Anglo-Saxon period include:

- Ælfwine, son of Æthelweard, who died in the Battle of Brunanburh (937)
- Ælfwine of Lichfield (died 937), Bishop of Lichfield
- Ælfwine of Wells (died 998), Bishop of Wells
- Ælfwine, a young warrior in the poem The Battle of Maldon
- Ælfwine of Elmham (died 1023), bishop of Elmham and Dunwich
- Ælfwine of Winchester (died 1047), Bishop of Winchester
- Aelfwine, Abbot of New Minster (died 1057), scribe or author of Aelfwine's Prayerbook (Cotton Titus D.xxvi)
- Ælfwine Haroldsson (11th century), son of Harald Harefoot, King of England
- Ælfwine of Warwick, Sheriff of Warwickshire under William the Conqueror

People with the Old High German name:

- Albuin, margrave of Carinthia (10th century)
- Albuin, son of the above, bishop of Brixen (d. 1006)

The earliest evidence of the name in Scandinavia dates to the 11th century. The Old Norse form of the name may thus be a loan from Low German or Anglo-Saxon. The name is attested on an 11th-century runestone in the Younger Futhark spelling alfuin, and possibly on a second one, as aulfun. An Old Swedish spelling of the name was Alwin.

In the Norman period, both Ælfwine and Æthelwine were shortened to Alwin. This subsequently became a surname.

== Modern ==
The name is extinct by the Late Middle Ages. It may have lingered longest in the Italian form Alboino, a name of Paolo Alboino della Scala (1343–1375), after Alboino I (d. 1311). It survived only in the English surname Alwin (variants Alwen, Alwyn, Allwyn, Elvin, Elwin, Elwyn), and there only by conflation with similar-sounding Anglo-Saxon names.

== J.R.R. Tolkien ==
In J.R.R. Tolkien's legendarium

- Ælfwine of England, an early character in fantasy writings of J. R. R. Tolkien
- Elfwine, son of Éomer and his successor as King of Rohan

== See also ==
- Alboin (disambiguation)
- Æthelwine
- Elbegast
- Alberich, a dwarf. He features most prominently in the poems Nibelungenlied and Ortnit
