= Æthelwine =

Æthelwine, Old English pronunciation: [ˈæθɫˌwi.ne] also Aethelwine or Ethelwine is an Anglo-Saxon given name meaning "noble friend". Its Old High German equivalent is Adalwin.

- Æthelwine of Abingdon (died 1030), abbot of Abingdon
- Æthelwine (Bishop of Durham) (died 1071), bishop of Durham
- Æthelwine of Lindsey, bishop of Lindsey
- Æthelwine of Athelney, Anglo Saxon Saint
- Æthelwine of Wells, bishop of Wells
- Æthelwine of Sceldeforde Anglo Saxon Saint
- Æthelwine, Ealdorman of East Anglia (died 992), son of Æthelstan Half-King
- Æthelwine, a son of Æthelweard (son of Alfred), who died in the Battle of Brunanburh (937)
- Adalwin (died 816), bishop of Regensburg
- Adalwin (died 873), bishop of Salzburg

== See also ==
- Ethelwina, Or The House of Fitz-Auburne, a play
- Edwin
- Alwin
- Alvin (disambiguation)
