= Hammers (disambiguation) =

Hammers is the plural of hammer. It may also refer to:

People with the surname

- Alwin Hammers (born 1942), German theologian and professor

Sports

- West Ham Hammers, British speedway team
- Lakeside Hammers, British speedway team
- Herzliya Hammers, Israeli amateur American football team
- Hammers, nickname for played from West Ham United F.C.

Other

- Pythagorean hammers, blacksmith's hammers associated with discovery of consonance

== See also ==
- Hammer (disambiguation)
