= Alwin =

Alwin is a German and Dutch form of Alvin and may refer to:

- Alwin-Broder Albrecht (1903–1945), German naval officer, one of Adolf Hitler's adjutants during World War II
- Alwin Berger (1871–1931), German botanist and contributor to the nomenclature of succulent plants
- Alwin Boerst (1910–1944), German World War II Luftwaffe Stuka ace
- Alwin Bully (1948–2023), Dominican cultural administrator, playwright, designer of the national flag of Dominica
- Alwin Elling (1897–1973), German filmmaker
- Alwin C. Ernst (1881–1948), American businessman, co-founder of the accounting firm of Ernst & Ernst
- Alwin de Prins (born 1978), former competitive swimmer who represented Luxembourg
- Alwin Hammers (born 1942), German theologian
- Alwin Karl Haagner (1880–1962), South African ornithologist
- Alwin Al Jarreau (1940–2017), American singer
- Alwin Kloekhorst (born 1978), Dutch linguist, Indo-Europeanist and Hittitologist
- Alwin Korselt (1864–1947), German mathematician
- Alwin McGregor (1889–1963), dual-code rugby footballer, represented New Zealand
- Alwin Mittasch (1869–1953), German chemist
- Alwin Nikolais (1910–1993), American choreographer
- Edgar Alwin Payne (1883–1947), American Western landscape painter and muralist
- Friedrich Carl Alwin Pockels (1865–1913), German physicist
- Don Alwin Rajapaksa (1905–1967), Sri Lankan politician and member of parliament
- Robert Alwin Schlumberger (1814–1879), entrepreneur, the first producer of sparkling wine in Austria
- Alwin Schockemöhle (born 1937), former German show-jumper
- Alwin Schultz (1838–1909), German art historian and medievalist, professor of art history at the Charles University in Prague
- Alwin Wagner (born 1950), West German discus thrower
- Alwin Wolz (1897–1978), highly decorated General major in the Luftwaffe during World War II

== See also ==
- Karl Alwin (1891–1945), German conductor who emigrated to Mexico
- Alwin Arundel Lowdham, protagonist in J. R. R. Tolkien's abandoned novel The Notion Club Papers (1945)
- Alwin der Letzte, 1960 East German film
- Allwyn
- Aylwin
- Alvin
- Halwin
