= T. J. Horsley Curties =

British novelist and a member of the Hanoverian court (d. 1869)

Sir Thomas Isaac Horsley Curties KB (d. 1869) was a British Gothic novelist and a member of the Hanoverian court. He is best remembered for his last novel, The Monk of Udolpho (1807), which drew criticism for its title's apparent plagiarism of the best-selling novels The Monk (1796) and The Mysteries of Udolpho (1794).

== Novels ==
- Ethelwina, Or The House of Fitz-Auburne (1799)
- Ancient Records, Or, The Abbey of Saint Oswythe (1801)
- The Scottish Legend, Or The Isle of Saint Clothair (1802)
- The Watch Tower; Or, The Sons of Ulthona (1804)
- St. Botolph’s Priory; Or, The Sable Mask (1806)
- The Monk of Udolpho (1807)
