= Paul Kraske =

German surgeon (1851–1930)

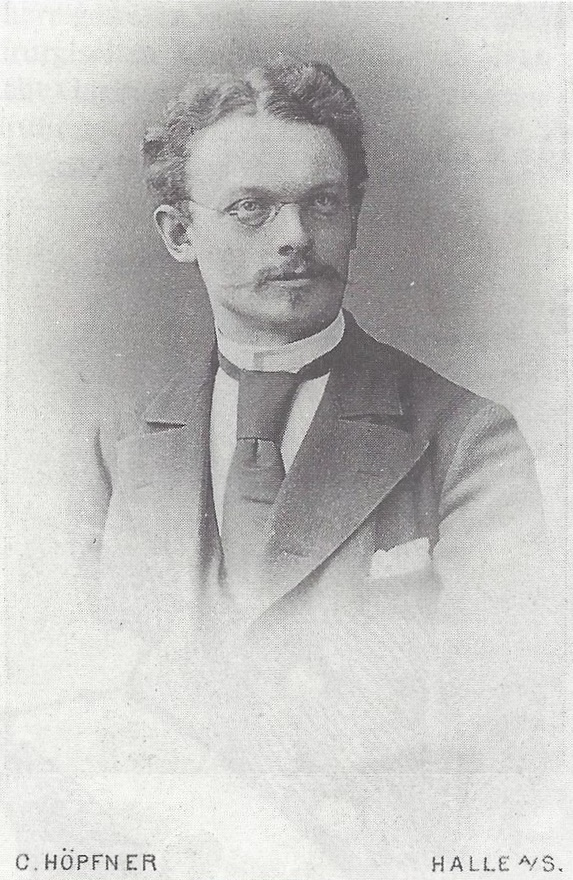
Paul Kraske as a student

Paul Kraske (2 June 1851, Berg, Province of Silesia – 15 June 1930, Freiburg im Breisgau) was a German surgeon.

He studied medicine at the universities of Halle and Leipzig, receiving his doctorate at Halle in 1874. While a student, he served as a volunteer soldier in a fusilier regiment during the Franco-Prussian War. After graduation, he spent several years as an assistant to Richard von Volkmann at the surgical clinic in Halle, then from 1883 to 1919 was a professor and head of the surgical clinic at the University of Freiburg.

He held a particular interest in colorectal cancer, and is remembered for introducing a transsacral approach for the extirpation of cancers of the rectum ("Kraske's operation").

== Selected works ==
- Beiträge zur Lehre von dem Einflusse der Nerven auf die Ernährung der Gewebe, 1874 – Study on the influence of nerves involving the nutrition of tissues.
- Experimentelle Untersuchungen ueber die Regeneration der quergestreiften Muskeln, 1878 – Experimental studies on the regeneration of striated muscles.
- Die sacrale Methode der Exstirpation von Mastdarmkrebsen und die Resectio recti, 1887 – The sacral method for extirpation of rectal cancers and resection of the rectum.
