= The Watch Tower; Or, the Sons of Ulthona =

1804 novel by T. J. Horsley Curties

- Author: T. J. Horsley Curties
- Genre: Gothic fiction
- Publication date: 1804

The Watch Tower; Or, the Sons of Ulthona (1804) is a Gothic novel by T. J. Horsley Curties.

The story is set in Scotland in the 1300s.

The novel cites William Shakespeare as an important influence, especially to justify the story's inclusion of ghosts. It draws on Macbeth, rather than the more Scottish poetry by Ossian for its plot elements.
