= Alwin Schultz =

German art historian and medievalist

Alwin Schultz (6 August 1838 – 10 March 1909) was a German art historian and medievalist, professor of art history at the Charles University in Prague.

== Biography ==
He was born at Muskau, Lusatia. He studied archaeology and Germanic philology at the University of Breslau (1858/59 and 1862–64), and in 1859–61 attended the Bauakademie in Berlin, where he also took drawing classes. In 1866 he became a docent for Christian archaeology and art history at Breslau, where in 1872 he was named an associate professor. In 1882 he was called to the University of Prague as a full professor.

Among his publications are a treatise on the Minnesingers in two volumes (1889) and a discussion of Germany in the 14th and 15th centuries (1892) as well as a treatise on domestic life in Europe during the Middle Ages and the Early Modern period (1903).

== Bibliography ==
- 1868: Das Rathhaus zu Breslau in seinen äusseren und inneren Ansichten und Details, (with Carl Lüdecke).
- 1869: Beschreibung der Breslauer Bilderhandschrift des Froissart – Description of the Breslau manuscript of Froissart.
- 1870: Schlesiens Kunstleben im dreizehnten und vierzehnten Jahrhundert – Silesian artistic life in the thirteenth and fourteenth centuries.
- 1878: Die Legende vom Leben der Jungfrau Maria und ihre Darstellung in der bildenden Kunst des Mittelalters – The legend of the life of the Virgin Mary: and its representation in the visual arts of the Middle Ages.
- 1882: Untersuchungen zur Geschichte der Schlesischen Maler (1500-1800).
- 1889: Das höfische Leben zur Zeit der Minnesinger (2nd edition) – The court life at the time of Minnesinger.
- 1892: Deutsches Leben im XIV. und XV. Jahrhundert (2 vols) – German life in the XIV and XV centuries.
- 1894 et seq.: Allgemeine Geschichte der bildenden Künste – General history of the fine arts.
- 1901: Kunst und Kunstgeschichte (2nd edition) – Art and art history.
- 1903: Das Häusliche Leben der europäischen Kulturvölker vom Mittelalter bis zur zweiten Hälfte des XVIII. Jahrhunderts – The domestic life of the peoples of Europe from the Middle Ages to the mid-18th century.

He was the author of biographies on Karl Daniel Friedrich Bach and Johann Gustav Gottlieb Büsching in the Allgemeine Deutsche Biographie.
