= Bad Muskau =

Bad Muskau/Mužakow
- Town
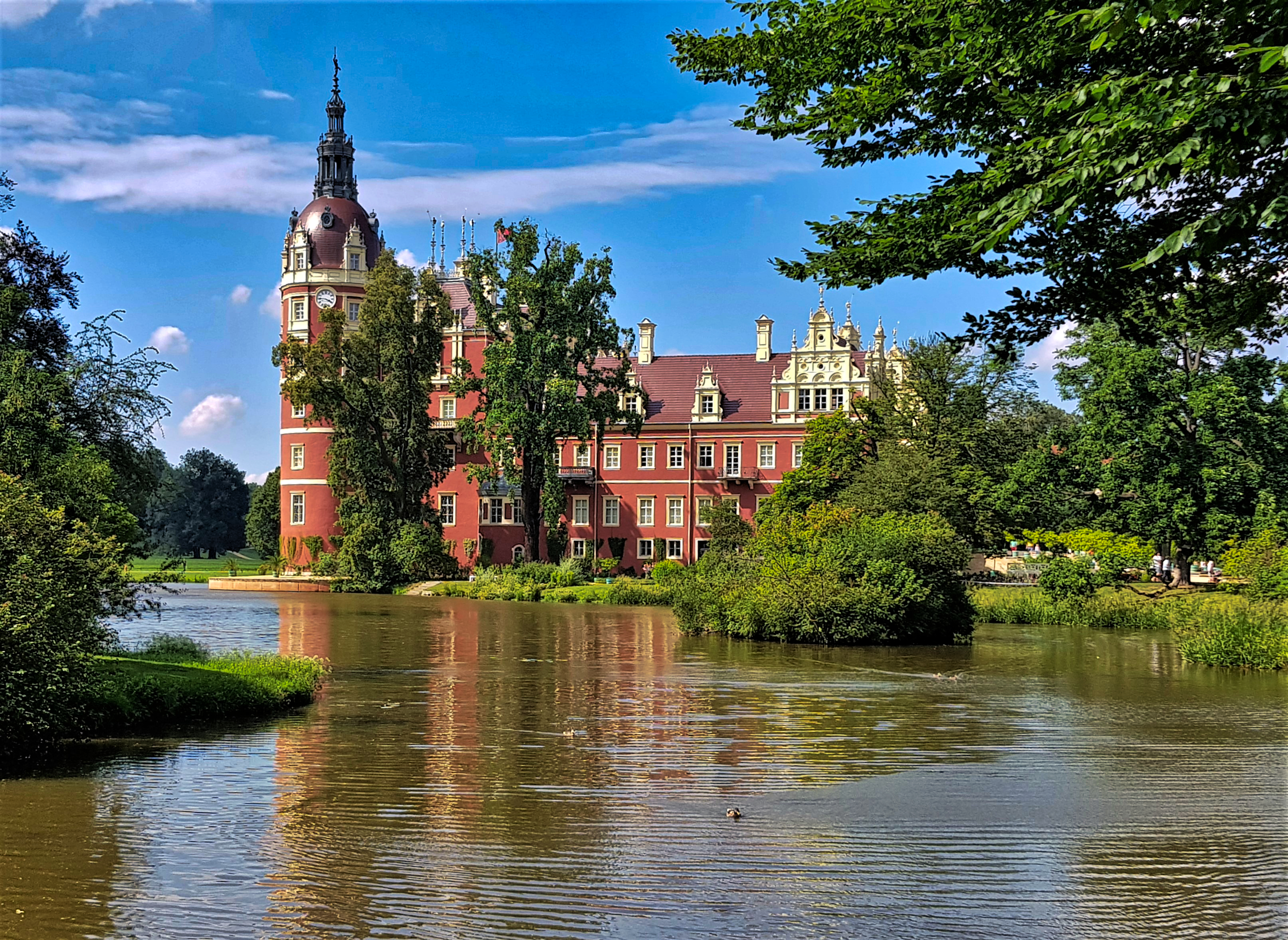
- Muskau Castle

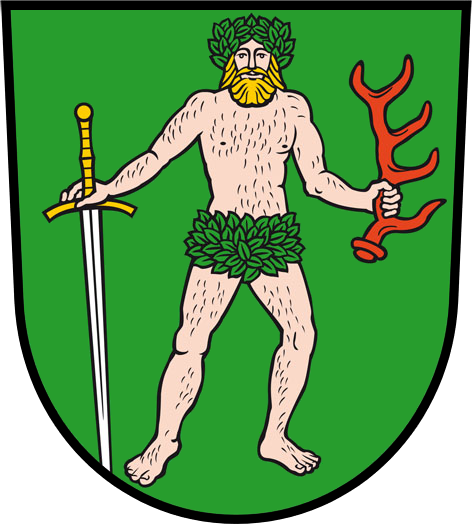
- Coat of arms

- Location of Bad Muskau/Mužakow within Görlitz district
- Interactive map of Bad Muskau/Mužakow
- Location within Germany Location within Saxony
- Coordinates: 51°33′N 14°43′E
- Country: Germany
- State: Saxony
- District: Görlitz
- Subdivisions: 3

Government
  - Mayor (2019–26): Thomas Krahl (CDU)

Area
  - Total: 15.35 km^{2} (5.93 sq mi)
- Elevation: 110 m (360 ft)

Population (2025-12-31)
  - Total: 3,508
  - Density: 228.5/km^{2} (591.9/sq mi)
- Time zone: UTC+01:00 (CET)
  - Summer (DST): UTC+02:00 (CEST)
- Postal codes: 02953
- Dialling codes: 035771
- Vehicle registration: GR, LÖB, NOL, NY, WSW, ZI
- Website: www.badmuskau.de

Bad Muskau (German pronunciation: [ˌbaːt ˈmʊskaʊ]) or Mužakow (Upper Sorbian pronunciation: [ˈmuʒakɔf]; named Muskau in German until 1962; Polish: Mużaków; Czech: Mužakov) is a spa town in the historic Upper Lusatia region in eastern Germany, at the border with Poland. It is part of the Görlitz district in the State of Saxony.

It is located on the banks of the Lusatian Neisse river, directly opposite the town of Łęknica. It is part of the recognized Sorbian settlement area in Saxony. Upper Sorbian has an official status next to German, with all villages bearing names in both languages.

Bad Muskau gained worldwide fame through prince and landscape artist Hermann von Pückler-Muskau, who created a unique cultural asset with his landscape park. The Muskau Park, a UNESCO World Heritage Site, is split between Bad Muskau and Łęknica.

== History ==
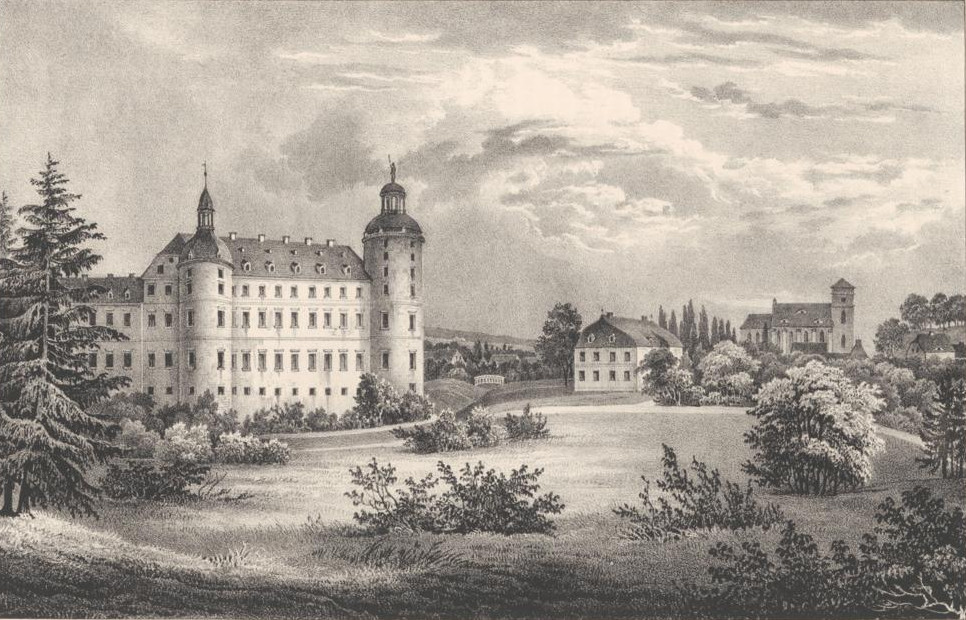
19th century view of the Muskau Park

Muskau (Sorbian, "men's town") was founded in the 13th century as a trading center and defensive location on the Neisse, being first mentioned in a document in 1249. The state country (Standesherrschaft) of Muskau was the largest of the Holy Roman Empire. From 1319 it was part of the Duchy of Jawor, one of Lower Silesian duchies of fragmented Piast-ruled Poland. In 1329 it passed to the Bohemian (Czech) Kingdom, where it formed part of the Margraviate of Upper Lusatia, a Bohemian (Czech) Crown Land. The town passed into the possession of the von Bieberstein family in 1447, gaining its charter in 1452. Part of the von Bieberstein crest, the red five-pointed stag horn, remains in the town's coat of arms.

By the 1635 Peace of Prague it passed to the Electorate of Saxony, later elevated to the Kingdom of Saxony in 1806. Between 1697 and 1763, it was also under the rule of Polish kings in personal union and one of two main routes connecting Warsaw and Dresden ran through the town at that time. Kings Augustus II the Strong and Augustus III of Poland often traveled that route. In 1815, the northern and eastern parts of Upper Lusatia came to Prussia as a result of the Congress of Vienna, which reorganized the political order of Europe after the Coalition Wars (1792–1815) and from then on bore the official name "Prussian Upper Lusatia". Administratively, this area was integrated into the Province of Silesia and later into the Province of Lower Silesia, which existed until 1945.

In the so-called "Zornfeuer" of 1766, the city burned down completely; Only the town church and the castle on the Burglehn were spared. During the withdrawal of the Napoleonic army from Russia in 1813, Württemberg cuirassiers brought a typhus epidemic to Muskau, which killed around a fifth of the population. The inhabitants lived (with a few exceptions) in the status of hereditary subservience, which only ended after 1815 under Prussian rule.

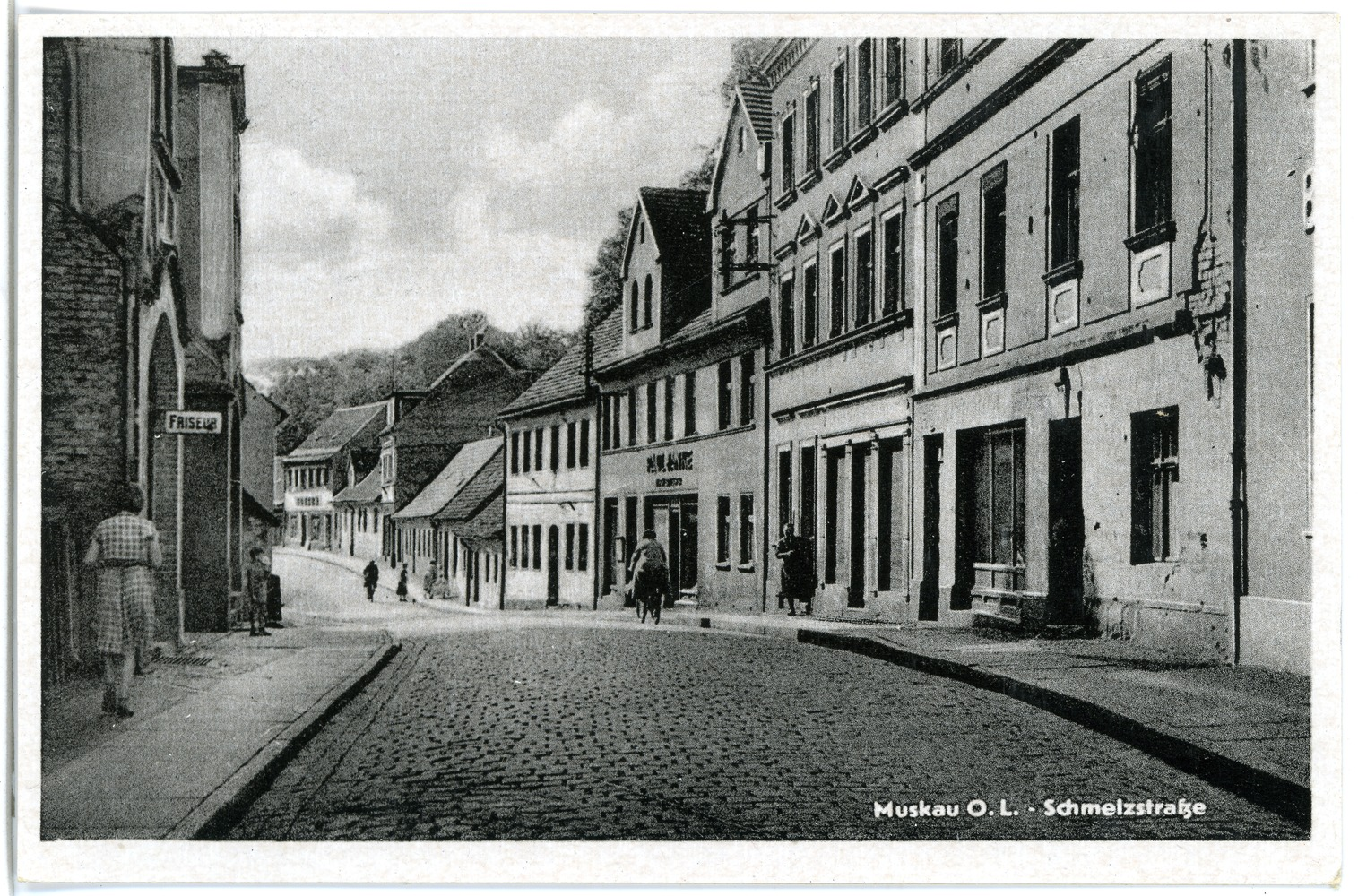
Schmelzstrasse in 1955

Due to the rich clay deposits, a strong pottery trade developed in Muskau. During its heyday from the 17th to the middle of the 19th century, up to 20 masters settled in the southern suburb of the town, the Schmelze (today Schmelzstrasse).

The first documented mention of alum mining in the town of Muskau comes from 1573. The alum hut, laid out on the site of today's bathing park, was once one of the oldest in Saxony, along with the huts in Reichenbach, Schwemsal and Freienwalde. Alum mining stopped in 1864.

In the 19th century, lignite was mined in the area between Muskau and Weißwasser.

Until the beginning of the 19th century Muskau's direct rulers were the Counts of Callenberg, succeeded up to 1845 by Count (later Prince) Hermann von Pückler-Muskau, later on by Prince Wilhelm Friedrich Karl von Oranien-Nassau, and after him by the Counts von Arnim, right up to their flight in April 1945.

In 1940, the modern separate town of Łęknica as incorporated into Bad Muskau as Lugknitz, before it was separated in 1945.

Towards the end of the Second World War, the city was severely damaged by artillery fire from the Soviet Army, which was pushing over the Neisse, and by the 2nd Polish Army. After World War II, the town was divided along the Neisse River between East Germany and Poland. About two thirds of the park came under Polish administration. In Autumn 1945, the castle and large parts of the city fell victim to a fire. In July 1945, Count von Arnim received the notification that “class rule and all businesses had been seized without compensation." Muskau was largely rebuilt with the exception of the town church, the Sorbian St. Andrew's Church, and the town hall. The town church was blown up in April 1959.

In 1962 Muskau was renamed "Bad Muskau" (spa town Muskau), with the construction of a sanatorium on the site of brine source. In 1972 the border crossing between East Germany and Poland was opened and visa-free local border traffic was allowed.

Sorbs still make up a large portion of the population, with the Muskau dialect spoken in and around the town.

== Transportation ==
=== Roads ===
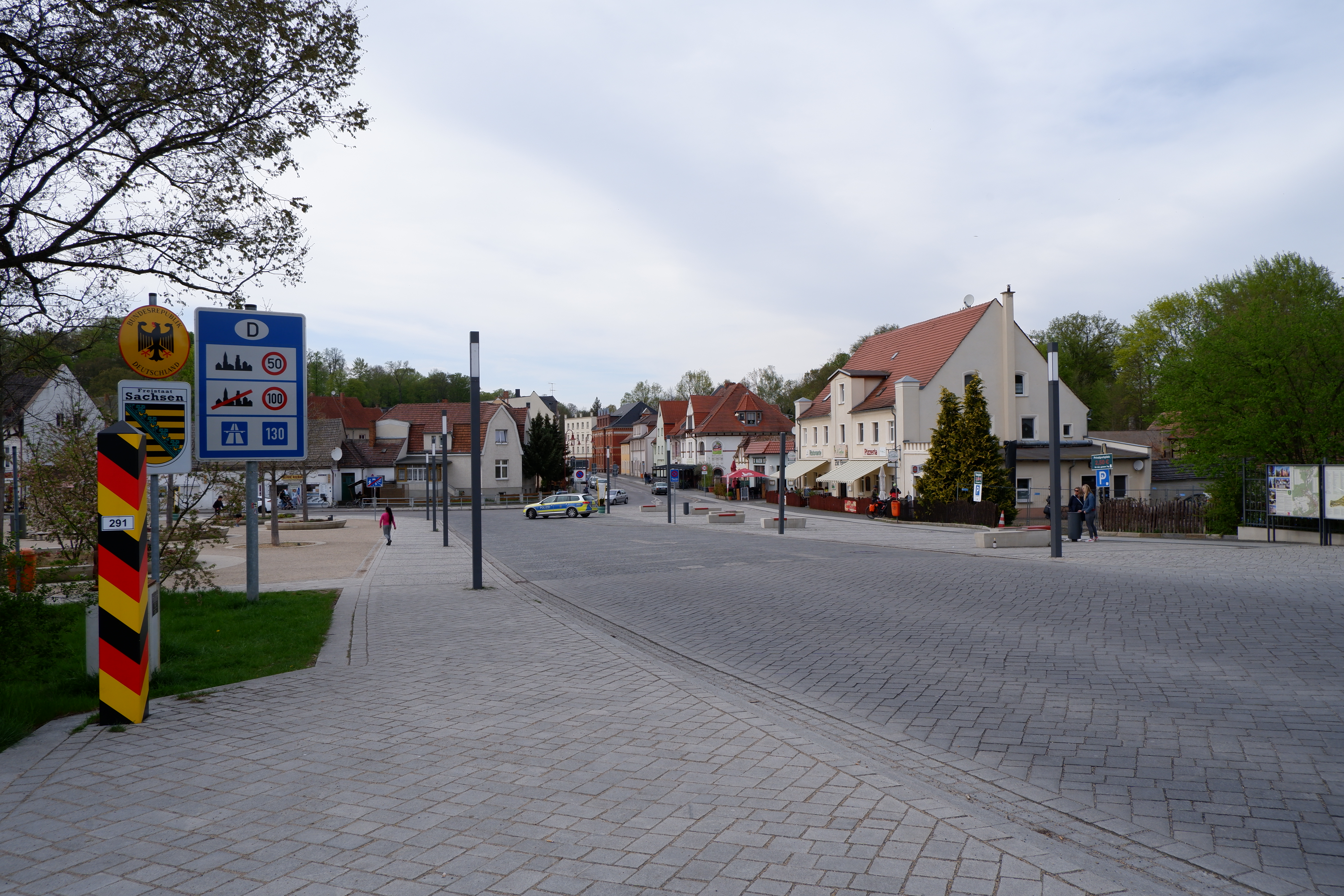
Border crossing at Hermannplatz

Bad Muskau lies on the B115, which runs from Brandenburg via Forst, through Bad Muskau and Niesky, to Görlitz. A few kilometres from the town, Federal Highway 156 passes through the neighbouring village of Krauschwitz. The Bad Muskau–Łęknica border crossing at the Postbrücke (formerly also known as the Sorauer Brücke) runs alongside the park and leads to a Polish market; until the opening of the Krauschwitz–Łęknica border crossing (2011), this was also the starting point of Droga krajowa 12 (DK12), which has since run from the latter to the Polish-Ukrainian border. For pedestrians and cyclists, there are further bridges over the Neisse in the park: the English Bridge (Englische Brücke) and the Double Bridge (Doppelbrücke).

=== Railway ===
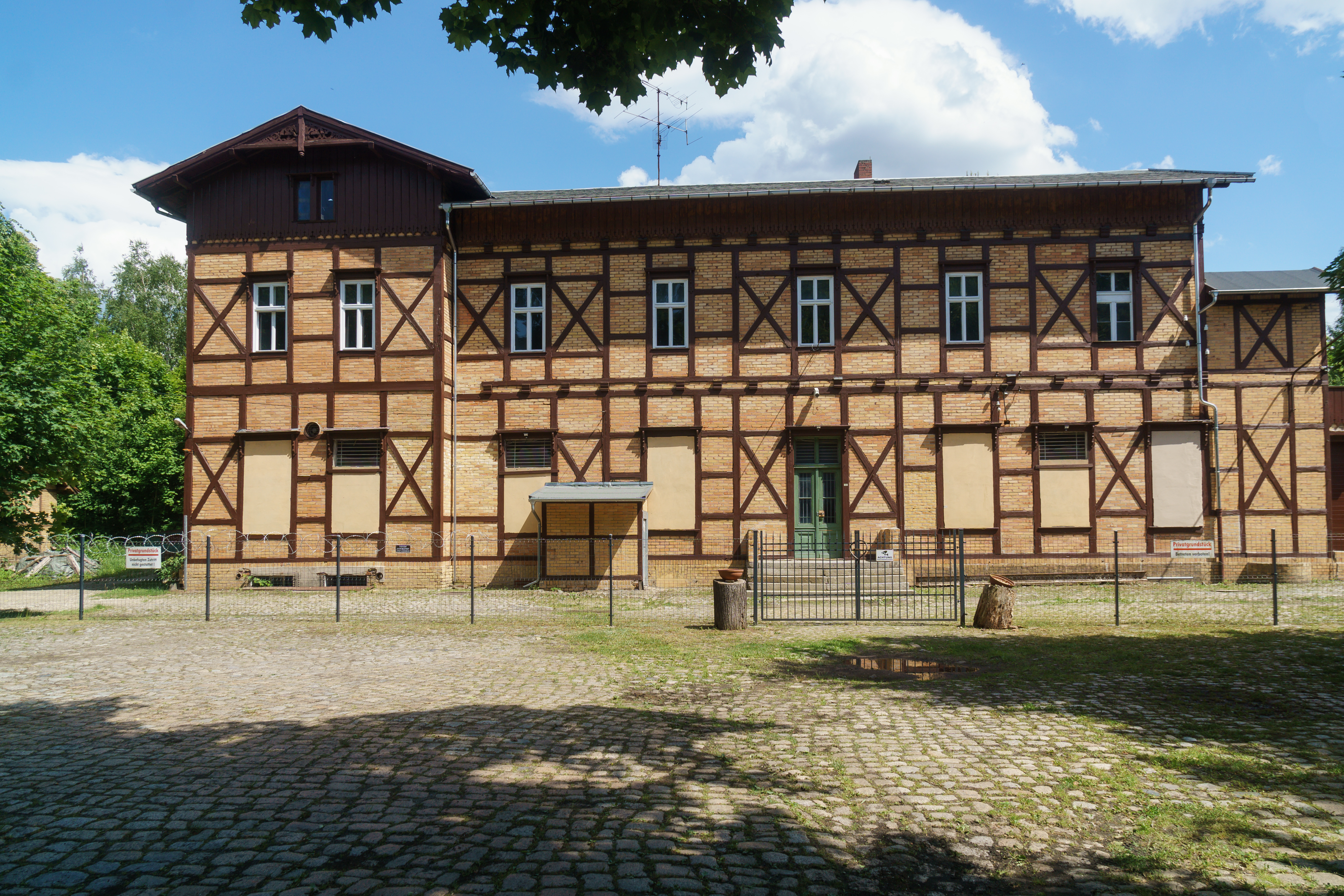
Bad Muskau station

Of the former rail links in Muskau, only the rebuilt Muskau Forest Railway (Waldeisenbahn Muskau) is still in operation.

The Weißwasser–Bad Muskau railway line and the later extension to Sommerfeld have been closed in the Bad Muskau area. In 2014/2015, a cycle path was created on a section of the route, which now runs mainly through Poland; this leads over the railway bridge to Bad Muskau and connects to the Oder-Neisse Cycle Route via a steep ramp.

== Governance ==
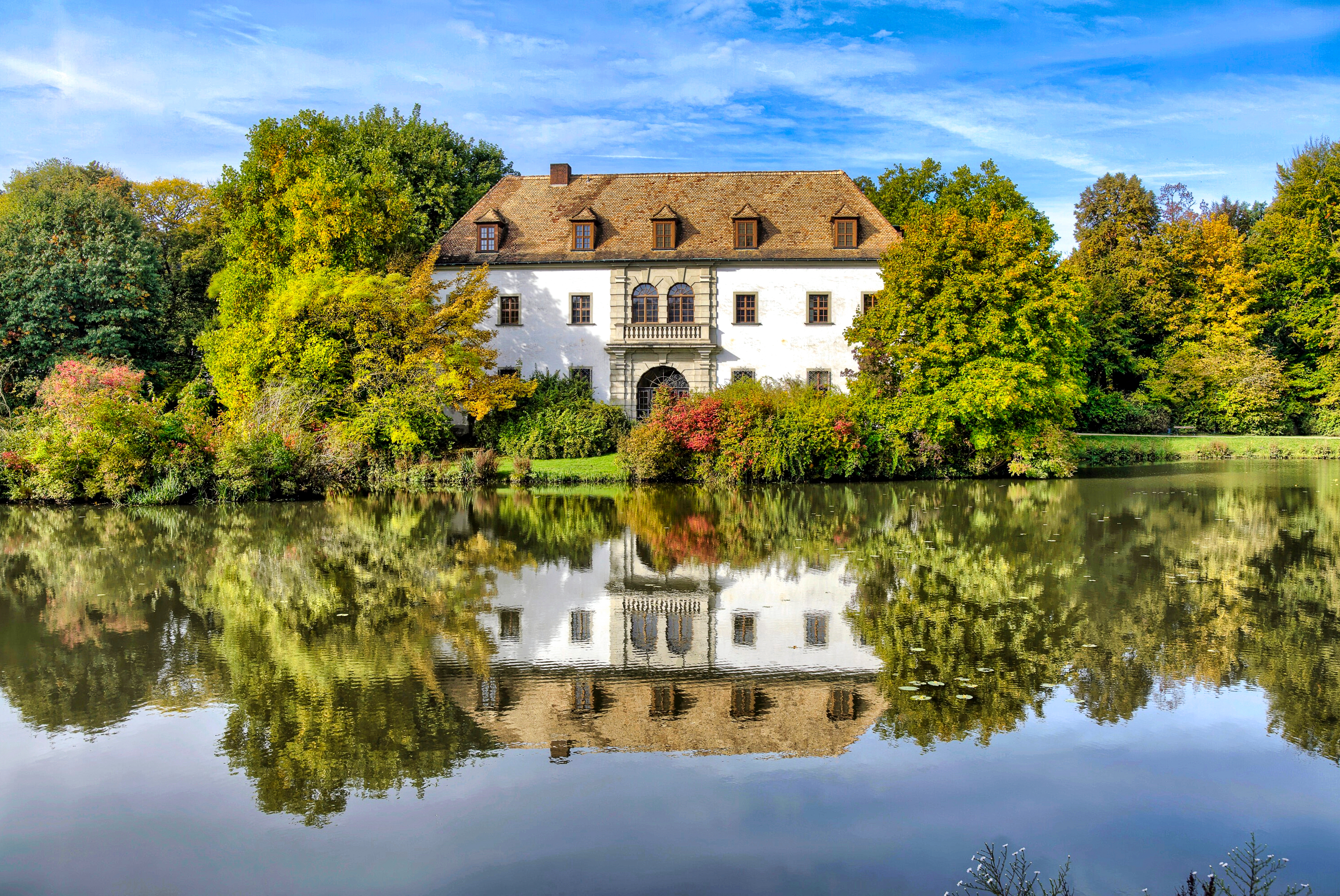
Old Castle

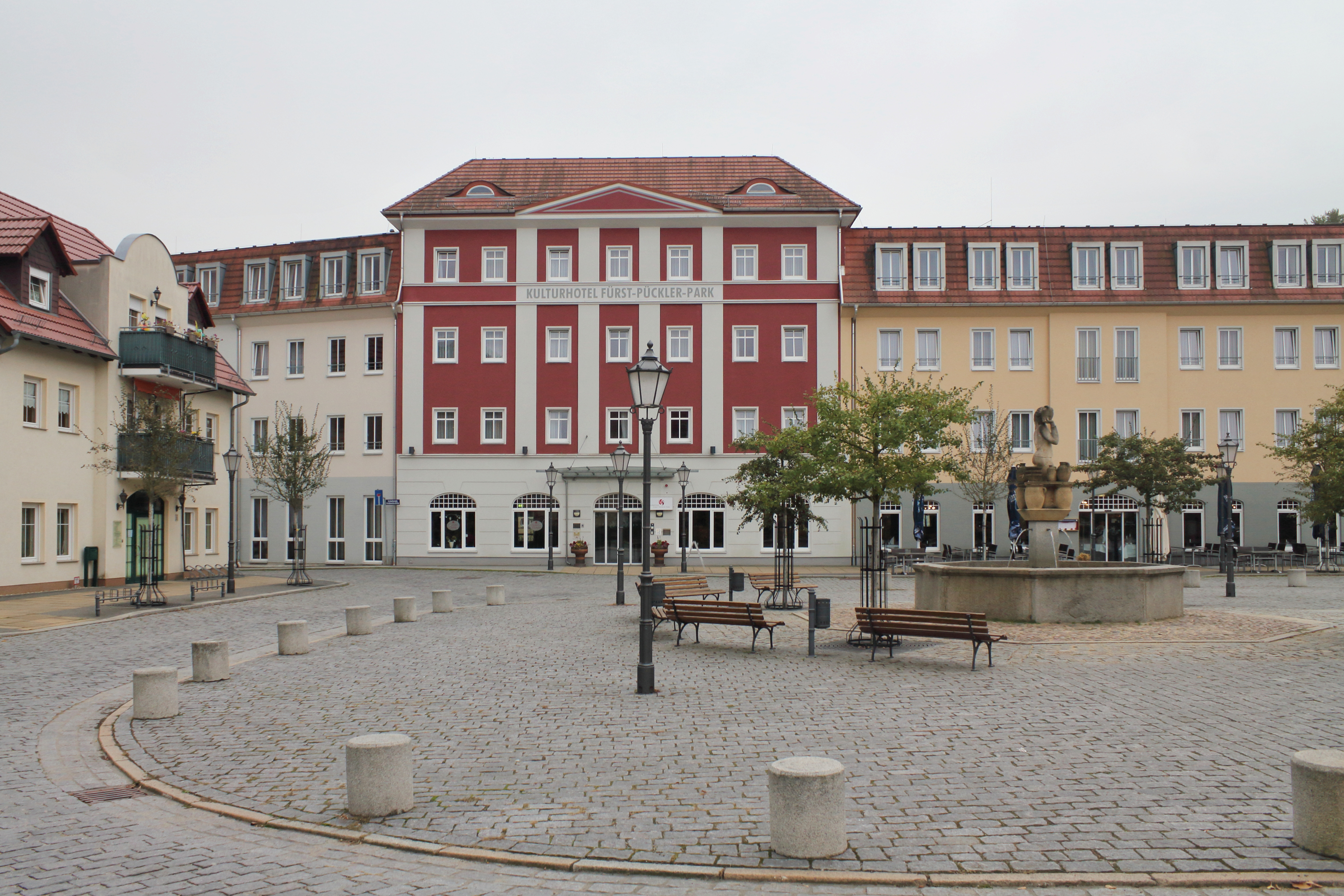
Main square

=== Town twinning ===
- Łęknica, Poland
- Bolków, Poland

== Notable people ==
- Nathaniel Gottfried Leske (1751–1786), natural scientist and geologist
- Leopold Schefer (1784–1862), writer and composer
- Hermann von Pückler-Muskau (1785–1871), famous landscape gardener and writer, founder of the Park von Muskau
- Gustav Fechner (1801–1887), experimental psychologist
- Eduard Petzold (1815–1891), landscape gardener
- Alwin Schultz (1838-1909), art and cultural historian
- Paul Kraske (1851–1930), surgeon
- Bruno von Mudra (1851-1931), General of Infantry and freeman of Muskau
- Werner Richter (1888-1969), writer
- Erna Pfitzinger (1898–1988), potter
- Karl Peglau (1927-2009), traffic psychologist, inventor of the East German Ampelmännchen for traffic lights
- Olaf Zinke (1966), skater, Olympic gold medalist
- Tim Kleindienst (1995), soccer player

In addition, a number of professional hockey players were born in Bad Muskau:

- Ronny Arendt (born 1980)
- Frank Hördler (born 1985)
- Ivonne Schröder (born 1988)
- Elia Ostwald (born 1988)
- Toni Ritter (born 1990)
