= Æthelwine of Sceldeforde =

Seventh-century saint

Æthelwine of Sceldeforde was a seventh-century saint, venerated in the Roman Catholic and Eastern Orthodox churches, who lived in Anglo-Saxon England. He is known to history from records in the hagiography of the Secgan Manuscript. He was venerated as a saint after his death, though some question his historical authenticity.

His name comes from two Anglo-Saxon words, aethel (prince) and wine (friend protector). Æthelwine was a common name in the Anglo-Saxon era.
