= Alboin (disambiguation) =

Alboin (530s–572) was the King of Lombards from about 560 until 572.

Alboin may also refer to:

- Alboin of Spoleto, Lombard Duke of Spoleto from 757 to 758
- Alboin, a character in The Lost Road by J. R. R. Tolkien

== See also ==
- Albion (disambiguation)
- Alboino I della Scala (c. 1284–1311), seignor of Verona
- Paolo Alboino della Scala (1343–1375), also seignor of Verona
