= Karl Daniel Friedrich Bach =

German painter

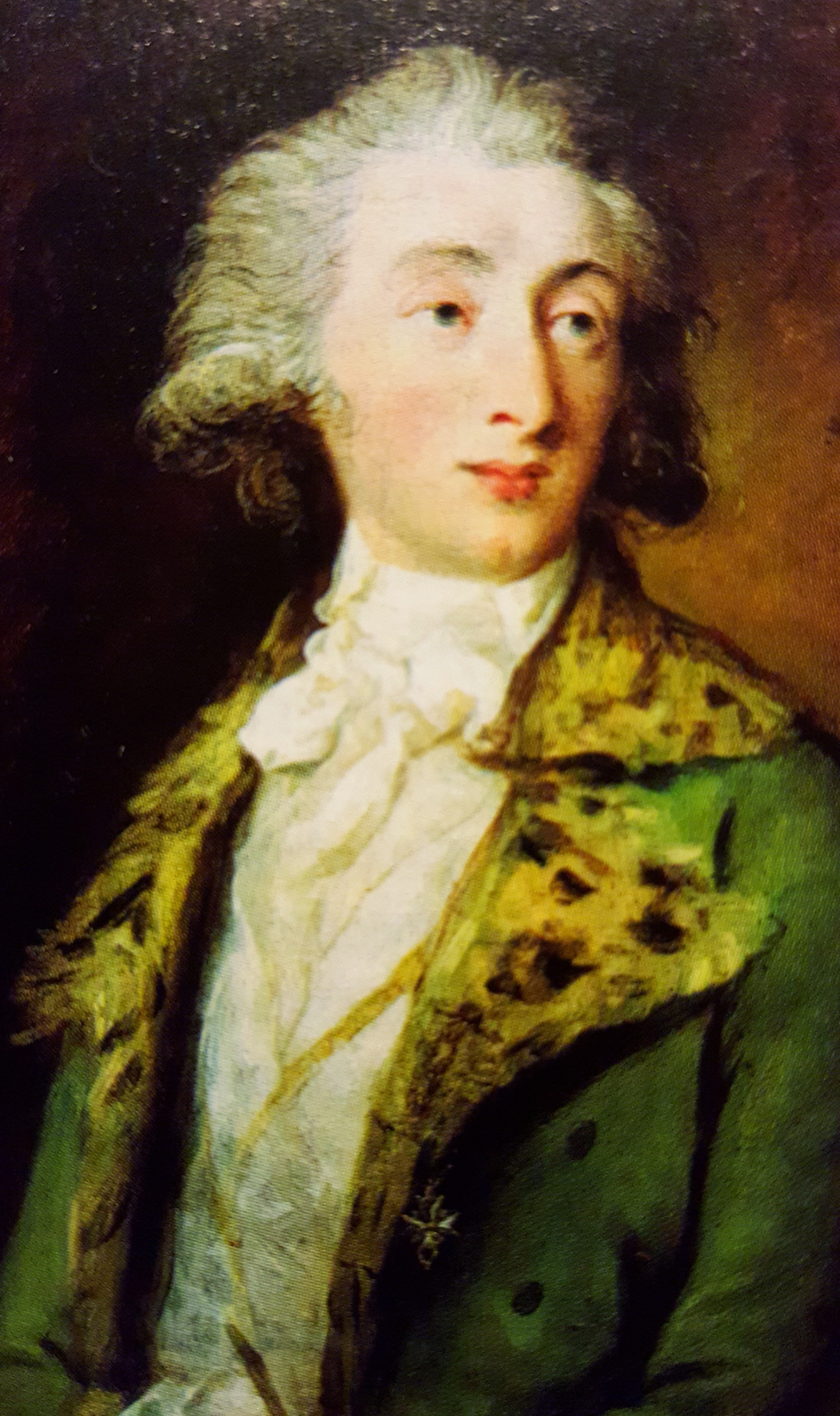
K.D.F. Bach (c.1780)

Karl Daniel Friedrich Bach (May 1756 – 8 April 1829; according to some sources in 1826) was a German painter.

== Biography ==
He was born in Potsdam. As his father was a merchant and an elder (Landesältester) of the Brandenburg Jewry (de), Bach was enabled to obtain from the Potsdam painter, A. B. Krüger, his first instruction in the art of painting; later, through the influence of Colonel Guichard ("Quintus Icilius"), he succeeded in entering the Berlin Academy of Arts, and became intimately connected with Lesueur, Daniel Chodowiecki and Frish. At Bach's insistence, life studies were introduced at the Academy. Bach soon distinguished himself with skillfully executed copies of old works, and, upon arriving in Warsaw with Count Ossolinski in 1780, achieved considerable success.

Later he accompanied Count John Potocki on his travels; copied paintings in Düsseldorf; and was made member of the local academy on 15 December 1785. Thence he went to Paris, and afterward to Italy, where he remained for four years (1786–1792), studying at the expense of his patron, Potocki, at first in Rome – where he applied himself chiefly to the productions of Raphael and Michelangelo – and subsequently in Portici, where the antiquities of Herculaneum held his attention. Elected a member of the Academy of Florence on 9 December 1788, he visited Venice, Vienna and Berlin, at which latter place he exhibited his productions – copies, for the most part – of works of Italian masters. In 1792, Bach was appointed a director and professor of the Breslau Art Academy and on 23 June 1794, he became member of the Academy of Berlin. Two years later, in conjunction with C. F. Benkendorf, he started a journal called Torso, devoted to "ancient and modern art"; but after a short time its publication was discontinued.

Bach published two treatises on art: Umrisse der Besten Köpfe und Parthien nach Rafael's Gemälden im Vatican and Anweisung Schöne Formen nach Einer Einfachen Regel zu' Bilden, für Künstler, Handwerker, und Freunde des Schönen. Bach made use of the etching-needle and in his paintings he chose historical subjects, portraits, animals and many allegorical themes, all conceived in the spirit of the epoch. Though not a very important figure in the world of art, he helped encourage fellow-artists in Germany, and promoted instruction in drawing, handicraft, etc. Bach died a Christian proselyte, in Breslau.

== See also ==
- List of German painters

== Sources ==
- J. F. A. De Le Roi, Geschichte der Evangelischen Judenmission, i. 56, Leipzig, 1899
- Julius Meyer, Allgemeines Künstler-Lexikon, ii., Leipzig, 1878
- Allgemeine Deutsche Biographie i., 1875
- Michael Bryan, Dictionary of Painters and Engravers, i., London, 1886
- Karl Daniel Friedrich Bach on Messianic Judaism Wiki
