= Allwyn =

Allwyn may refer to:

- Astrid Allwyn, an American stage and film actress
- Allwyn Cyclecars, a British cyclecar
- Hyderabad Allwyn Limited, a defunct manufacturing company in Hyderabad, India
- Allwyn Colony, a suburb in Hyderabad, India
- Allwyn Entertainment, a global lottery operator
  - Allwyn UK, UK-arm of the multinational company and owners of Camelot Group
