= Ethelwina, Or The House of Fitz-Auburne =

1799 Gothic novel by T. J. Horsley Curties

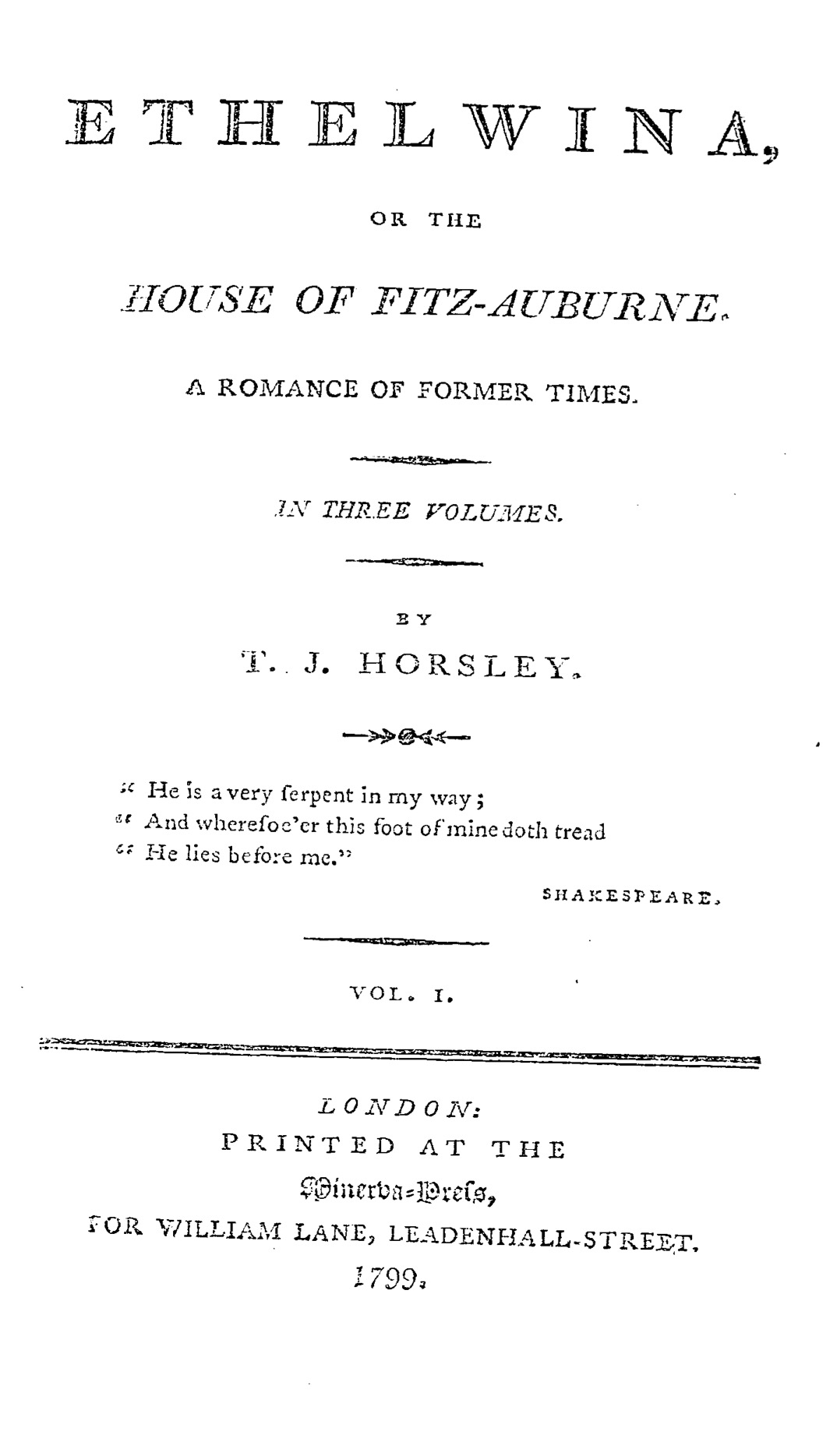
- Author: T. J. Horsley Curties
- Publisher: Minerva Press
- Publication date: 1799

Ethelwina, Or The House of Fitz-Auburne: A Romance of Former Times is a Gothic novel by T. J. Horsley Curties, first published in 1799 by the Minerva Press. The novel is set during the reign of King Edward III, and key early battles of the Hundred Years' War form an important background to the narrative. The plot follows Ethelwina as she is victimized by her cousin Leopold, who murders her father, kidnaps her, and attempts to force her into marriage in order to usurp her father's earldom, which she inherits as a countess. Her father's ghost protects her and urges vengeance. She escapes Leopold's castle, rescuing her also-kidnapped love interest Augustine along the way, and her brother kills Leopold; everyone lives virtuously and happily for the rest of their lives.

The novel is the first of six that Curties published with what the literary historian Dale Townshend identifies as "lower-end publishers" over the next eight years. It was translated into French and German in the early 1800s, but remained out of print in English until a 2008 edition by Valancourt Books. Thematically, the novel is conservative and Royalist, expressing the author's glorification of self-sacrifice in service to a monarch. Its historical setting and highly positive presentation of Edward III reflects a nostalgia for medieval chivalry. The plot is influenced by Shakespeare's Hamlet, particularly through the inclusion of a real ghost. The plot also addresses threats to women's property rights, a common theme in 1790s Gothic novels.

== Synopsis ==
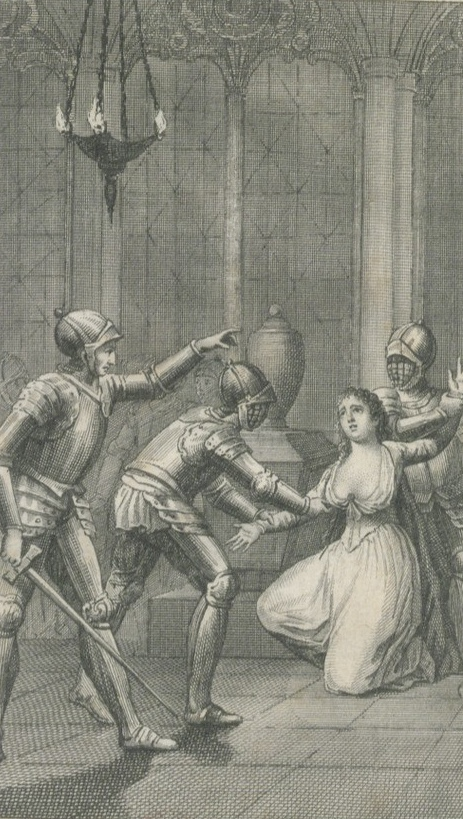
Illustration from the 1802 French edition: Ethelwina is kidnapped by Leopold

Earl Godfred of Fitz-Auburne is a military commander under King Edward III. He has a wife named Ursuline and two children, Ethelwina and Arthur. Their friend the Baron de Mountserville is found guilty of conspiring against Edward II, and commits suicide; Godfred adopts his orphaned children Augustine and Emma. Augustine and Ethelwina fall in love. Godfred's nephew Leopold de St. Iver asks Godfred for Ethelwina's hand in marriage, and vows revenge for his refusal. Godfred departs for war with France. Arthur disappears and is presumed murdered; Ethelwina suspects Leopold. Godfred is reported dead in battle. Leopold attempts to claim Godfred's earldom and marry Ethelwina, but Ursuline blocks him. King Edward recognizes Ethelwina as her father's heir and Countess of Auburne. He also knights Augustine takes him to war in France for the Battle of Crécy. Leopold threatens Ethelwina in the forest; an unknown rescuer fights him and she escapes. Ursuline dies. Leopold kidnaps Ethelwina, this time wounding her mysterious defender. He enacts a forced wedding ceremony while she is unconscious, and imprisons her at Iver Castle in Wales. Ethelwina swears never to acknowledge the marriage, which is not legally binding without her consent. Leopold attempts to sexually assault her, but Godfred's ghost prevents him.

Ethelwina finds bloody evidence that her father was murdered in her chamber, and discovers that Leopold has been drugging her to reduce her resistance. Her father's ghost leads her to his hidden remains in the castle vaults, where she swears vengeance. At another forced wedding ceremony, she publicly refuses to marry Leopold and accuses him of murder. Leopold attempts to kill her, then has a breakdown acknowledging his guilt. He re-imprisons her in a more remote cell, saying he will tell the world she has died. She discovers a secret passage and finds her long-lost brother Arthur, who explains their father's fate: Leopold kidnapped Godfred by tricking him into boarding a ship filled with hired criminals; he was aided by Ruthmer, a former Auburne servant dismissed for theft; they murdered Godfred in his sleep shortly after Arthur's kidnapping; Ruthmer attempted to murder Arthur, but Godfred's ghost scared him off. Ethelwina returns to her own cell, where Ruthmer demands she force her ward Emma to marry him in exchange for freedom. She refuses; he attempts to stab her, but she is saved by her guard, Bertram. Godfred's ghost visits Ethelwina to offer moral support.

Leopold gives Ethelwina an ultimatum: marry him, or see Arthur executed. Instead, she and Arthur flee; Ethelwina stabs Ruthmer, who falls off a bridge and dies. They escape the castle through its extensive underground passageways, where they find and free Augustine. The group is guided through mountain passes by a hermit bard, and travel toward Auburne disguised as pilgrims. Leopold's soldiers attack them and they are rescued by bandits, who change their minds about robbing the party. Augustine explains that he was Ethelwina's mysterious rescuer in the first volume. At Auburne, they learn that Emma is missing; Ethelwina's former guard Bertram arrives to report that Leopold kidnapped her, too, and she is still at Iver Castle. Arthur leads a rescue mission back through Iver's secret passages while Augustine joins Queen Philippa's Scottish campaign. Arthur rescues Emma from Leopold's imminent assault, and fatally stabs him. As he dies, Leopold sees visions of hell. Arthur returns with Emma and with Godfred's remains, which are interred in the family vault; Ethelwina dreams that her parents' ghosts are finally at peace. On Augustine's return from the war, King Edward grants him his father's titles and estates. Ethelwina and Augustine marry and settle at his father's former castle. Ethelwina gives her inherited fortune to Emma, who marries Arthur, and everyone lives virtuously and happily for the rest of their lives.

== Publication ==
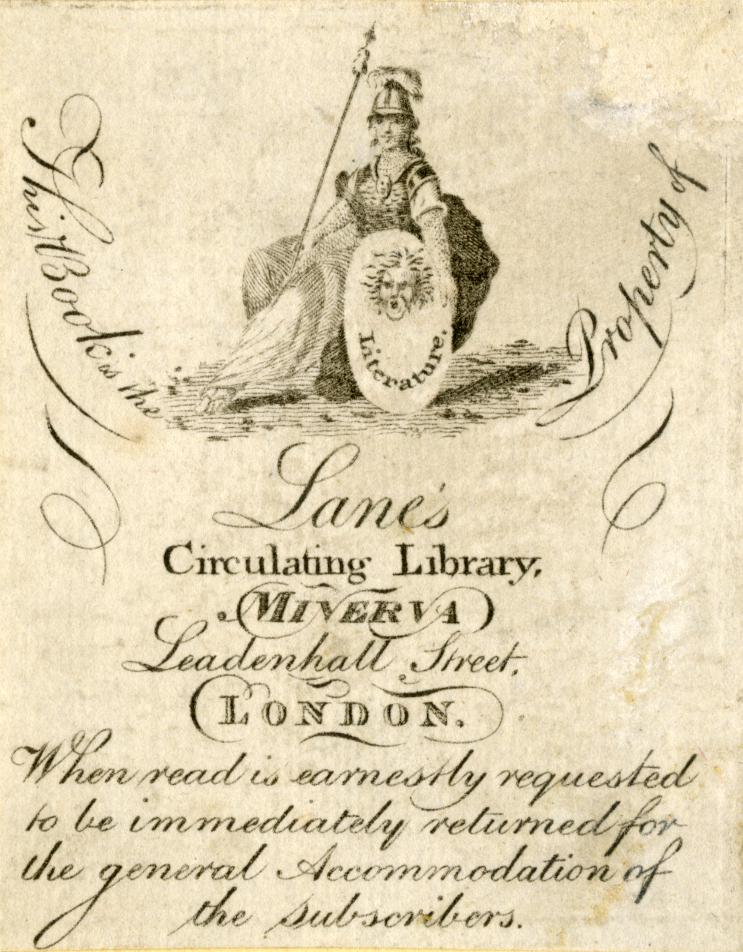
Bookplate for a Minerva Press novel urging readers to return it promptly to their circulating library

At the time of the novel's publication, Curties was around 22 years old. It is the first of at least six Gothic novels that Curties sold in the eight years from 1799 to 1807, all published by what the literary historian Dale Townshend identifies as "lower-end publishers". Ethelwina was published in three volumes by the Minerva Press in 1799. The Minerva Press was a prolific publisher of commercial fiction for circulating libraries, run by William Lane in London, and particularly associated with both women writers and readers.

Advertisements promoted Ethelwina as "in the press" on February 2 of that year, and as "published" by May 16. Townshend describes the publication as "semi-pseudonymous" because Curties omitted his last name from the title page, publishing only as "T. J. Horsley". His next novel, Ancient Records, Or, The Abbey of Saint Oswythe (1801), included a preface acknowledging Ethelwina more fully as his own work, saying: "He sent his Ethelwina into the world as an orphan, whose father feared to acknowledge it, under his Christian appellation of Horsley. The Public have fostered it; and now; with some degree of pride, he can claim it as his own by his surname CURTIES."

The literary historian James Jenkins describes its reception as "a modest, if not overwhelming, success". A French translation was produced in 1802, translated by Octave Ségur and published in Paris by F. Buisson. A German translation was published in Leipzig in 1803, under the title Ethelwina oder das Fräulein von Westmoreland. An abridged chapbook of the story was also produced. No eighteenth-century reviews have been identified.

The original printing is now very scarce, with only three known copies held by libraries as of 2008. After being out of print ever since its first publication, a new edition was produced by Valancourt Books in 2008, edited and introduced by Jenkins. They call it "[o]ne of the finest Gothic novels of the 1790s".

== Style ==
Curties's primary stylistic influence is Ann Radcliffe, the pre-eminent Gothic novelist in the 1790s; following her model, Ethelwina emphasizes developing a Gothic "mood" through imagery and descriptions. James Jenkins describes Curties's writing as a moderately skilled imitation of Radcliffe: "its wonderfully evocative use of language and imagery ... actually at times approaches the level of a Radcliffe; indeed, in certain scenes [he is] nearly her equal. This is not to say that his writing is consistently good. It is not". Jenkins particularly notes frequent grammatical errors, and observes that it "is often rather long-winded".

Jenkins also identifies Ethelwina as "a very early psychological novel," highlighting the sequence in which Leopold secretly drugs Ethelwina to undermine her resistance to his forced marriage. He states: "Curties handles this depiction of Ethelwina's slow descent into near-madness very deftly, in a manner that anticipates novels to come half a century or more later."

== Major themes ==
=== Royalist Gothic and chivalric self-sacrifice ===
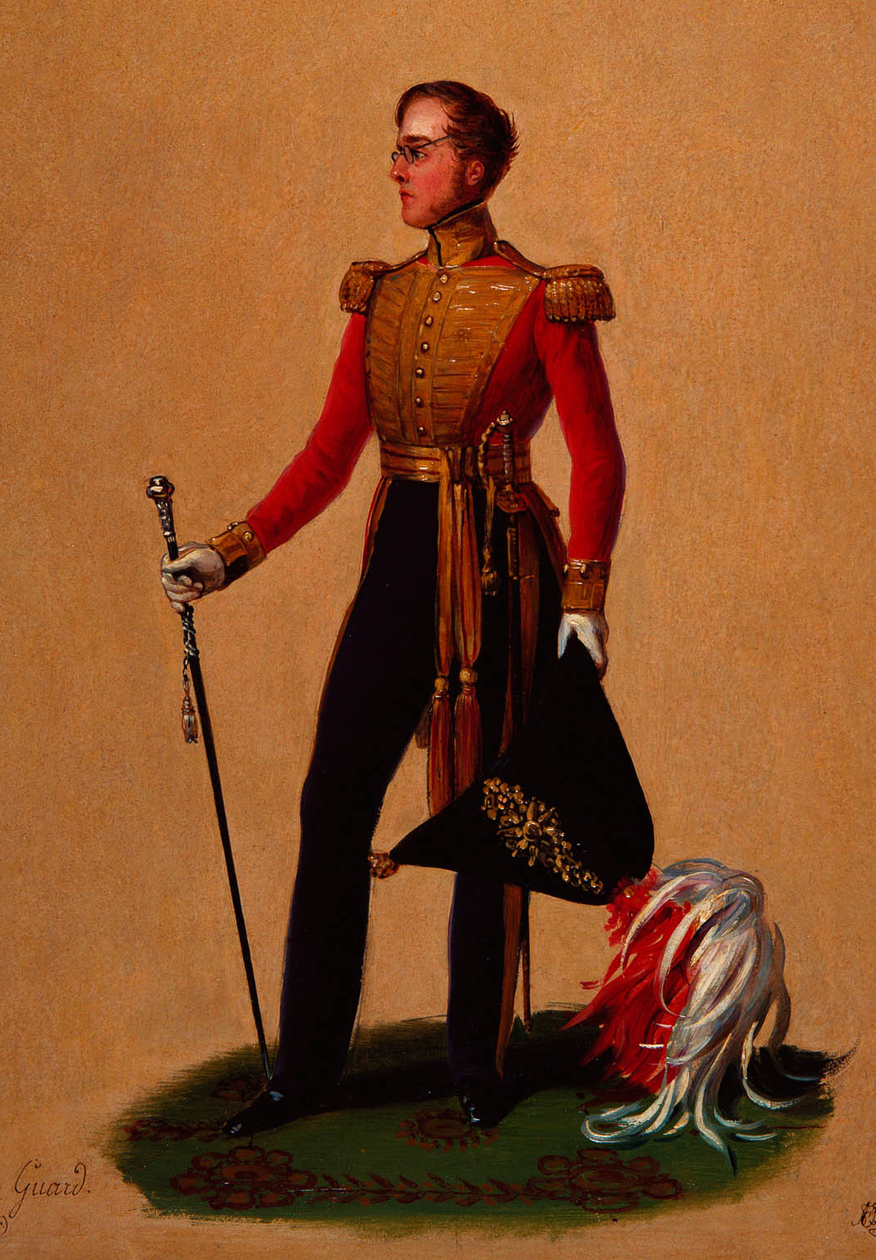
1836 Exon (lowest officer rank) in the Yeomen of the Guard, a position Curties held after 1805

Dale Townshend identifies Ethelwina as Royalist Gothic, which he calls "a fictional mode which, having retrieved the Gothic from its popular associations with radical jacobin politics of the 1790s, puts the form to decidedly conservative, counter-revolutionary and Royalist political use." A nostalgia for medieval chivalry was a common conservative discourse in the late eighteenth century, as exemplified in Edmund Burke's influential complaint in Reflections on the Revolution in France (1790) that "the age of chivalry is gone ... and the glory of Europe is extinguished for ever." The reign of Edward III was considered by late eighteenth-century historians as the pinnacle of medieval chivalry, reflected in the founding of the Order of the Garter. Curties's depiction of Edward III as a monarch aligns Ethelwina with the conservative, pro-Royalist historiographical endeavors of his day, as he carefully omits less flattering aspects of his reign that had begun to appear in contemporary historical accounts. The novel's detailed descriptions of Edward III's military campaigns against Scotland and France also serve to reinforce its celebration of English military supremacy and monarchical authority.

Townshend argues that the theme of Royalist self-sacrifice defines Curties’s body of work. In Ethelwina, one central theme is dying in place of another, particularly the fantasy of sacrificing one's life for that of the monarch. The character of Godfred, for example, is narratively praised and rewarded for his willingness to sacrifice himself on the battlefield for the king. In contrast, the Baron de Mountserville's temporary alliance with Queen Isabella against Edward II results in severe punishment. Although Mountserville withdraws from the conspiracy, the novel presents even temporary disloyalty to the sovereign as deserving of harsh consequences; it's presented as merciful when his death sentence is commuted to banishment and property confiscation. His son Augustine must also atone for his father's temporary disloyalty, and demonstrates his worth by protecting Queen Phillipa from an assassin's arrow at the cost of his own injury. According to Townshend, Curties' narrative choices are "a return to the 'Gothic' age of Edward III in an attempt at keeping the flame of chivalry alive." Townshend highlights Ethelwina as an indication of Curties' personal Royalist politics, which soon shaped his decision to join the Hanoverian Court's Yeomen of the Guard. This group of bodyguards for the monarch had become largely ceremonial by Curties' day; in 1805, Curties purchased a position at the lowest officer rank (Exon), an act Townshend describes as "more a performative enactment and expression of Curties’s political sensibilities than anything else".

=== The "real ghost" and Shakespeare's Hamlet ===
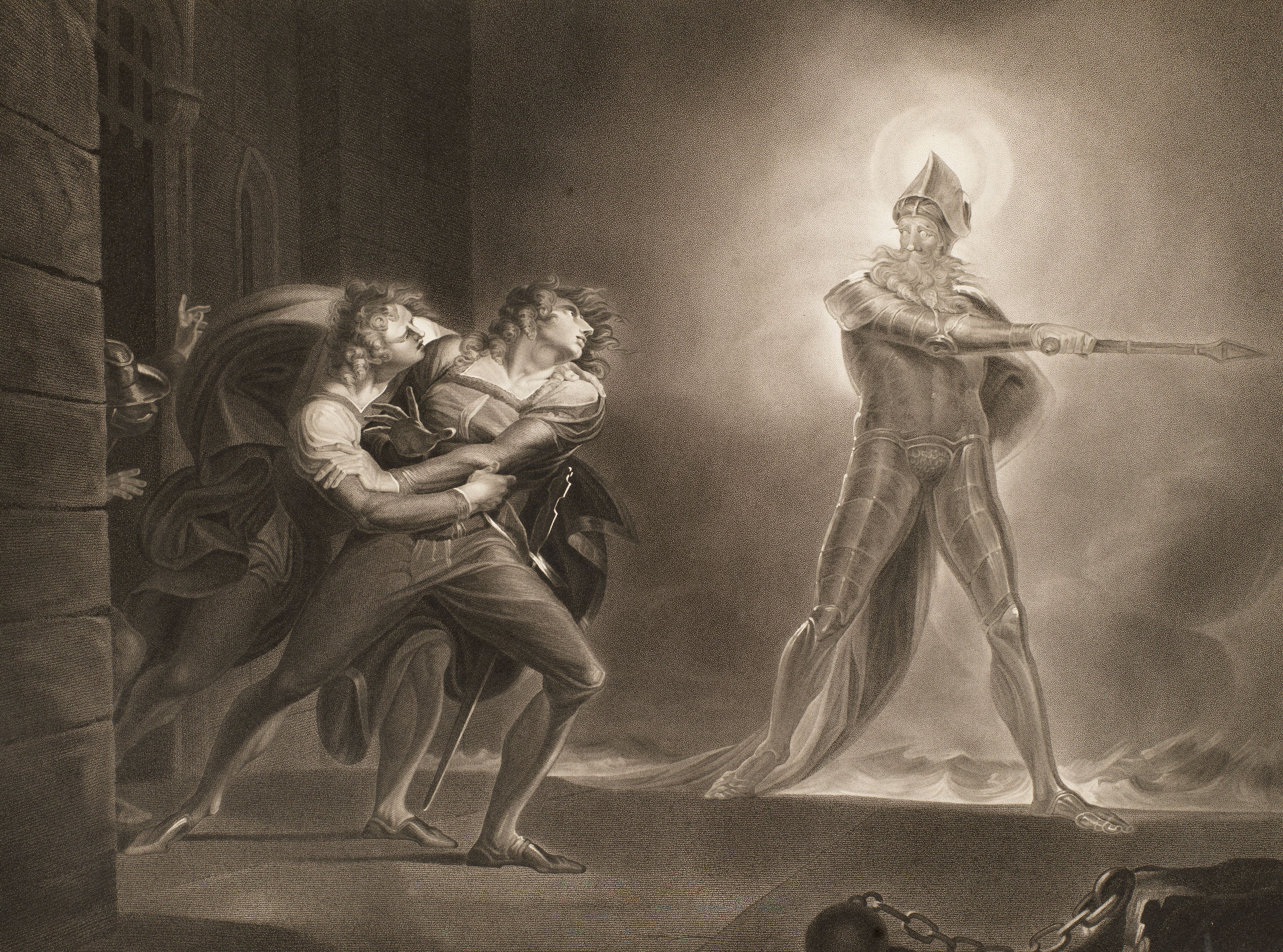
1796 illustration of Hamlet seeing his father's ghost

The novel contains several appearances of Godfred's and Ursuline's ghosts. Their presence departs from the convention of the "explained supernatural" (i.e., mysterious events which, after a period of suspense, are revealed to have rational explanations), which was dominant in Gothic fiction in the 1790s. The aesthetic role of the "explained supernatural" was tied to Edmund Burke's theory of the "sublime", as expressed in On the Sublime and Beautiful; in this theory, intense events which inspire "sublime terror" will have a salutary effect on readers' souls. Eighteenth century Gothic novels made a distinction between "terror" novels and "horror" novels: "terror" was associated with Ann Radcliffe, the sublime, and the "explained supernatural", while "horror" was associated with writers like Matthew Gregory Lewis, shocking or repugnant gore, and real ghosts. James Jenkins argues Ethelwina's inclusion of true supernatural events in a Radcliffean novel was "something almost revolutionary in Curties's time," and credits Curties as a literary innovator for combining the morally-elevating "terror" aesthetic with real ghosts.

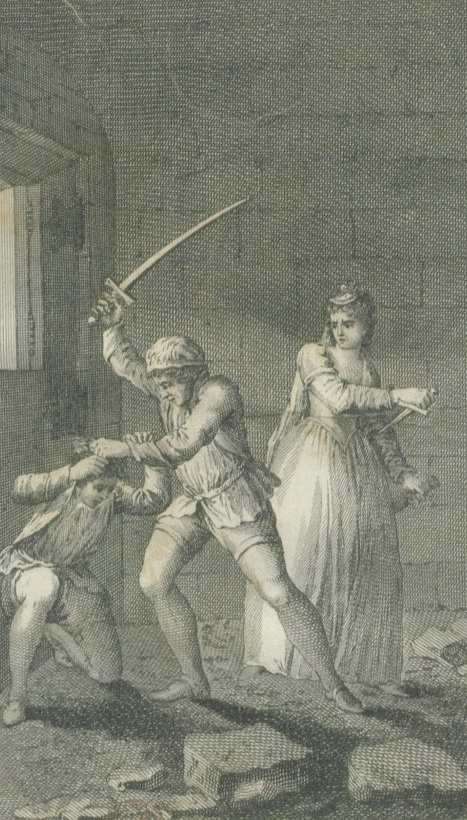
Illustration from the 1802 French edition: Ethelwina prepares to stab Ruthmer, who threatens Arthur

Curties' preface justifies "introducing a REAL GHOST" to the narrative by making a comparison to Shakespeare's Hamlet and highlighting that "this is not a tale of modern times". The plot also echoes Hamlet through the ghost's identification of his murderer and demands for revenge. In casting Ethelwina in Hamlet's narrative role, the novel wrestles with eighteenth-century gender norms. Ethelwina expresses frequent concerns that vengeance is inappropriate for the delicate heart of a woman. She delays direct action, and reinforces the softness of her femininity through her extensive mourning. Ultimately, her brother Arthur is the one who achieves revenge by killing Leopold. The literary scholar Steven Craig argues that Curties makes Arthur into "an active version of Prince Hamlet," implicitly suggesting that Shakespeare's original avenger (who behaves more like Ethelwina) was problematically passive or feminine. Craig further argues that the novel reinforces a conservative gender binary by positing that, in women, virtue is best expressed through delay and feeling, while in men, direct action is virtuous and necessary for justice.

=== Women's property rights ===
Gothic novels often focus on dynastic disputes and their associated contested property rights as core drivers of the plot. In the 1790s, they increasingly focused on contested female inheritance; the literary scholars Diane Hoeveler and James Jenkins argue that this shift reflects anxiety about women's property rights, as women's legal protections declined under the common law system. (Note: They say: "As Amy Louise Erickson has argued, women’s property rights were actually better protected under the earlier system of equity, chancery, and ecclesiastical law than under the new common law. ... By the early eighteenth century, however, provisos in common law limited a woman’s right to inherit land while new statutes were added to ecclesiastical law that reduced a woman’s rights to her husband’s or father’s goods. Further, the practice of dividing an estate equally among all surviving children was ended (21–39).") They highlight women's use of written legal technologies, such as wills, to defend their property rights within novels. For example, when Ethelwina’s mother rejects Leopold's attempt to identify himself as the new Earl of Fitz-Auburne, she sends him a copy of the deed left by Edward III confirming Ethelwina's inheritance. Ethelwina is the heir of both her father and her maternal grandfather, thanks to what the novel describes as "the extraordinary testament of her grandfather"; even the arrival of a younger brother does not displace her. Townshend describes this as "a fantasy-fuelled violation of the patriarchal laws of primogeniture", one that echoes the inheritance plot in Ann Radcliffe's Mysteries of Udolpho. He also highlights the monarchist implications of Ethelwina's reliance on Edward III to enforce her claim to her parents' estates, since she gains more effective protection as a ward of the crown than she receives from her own parents.
