= Alwin Hammers =

German Catholic theologian

Alwin Hammers (born 2 November 1942 in Bitburg, Rhineland-Palatinate) is a German theologian.

Hammers was born at Bitburg. He spent his childhood in Mürlenbach, Eifel. He studied philosophy and theology in Trier. He wanted to become a Roman Catholic priest. During his university studies he met his wife. He married and had two children. Hammers stopped to become a priest and studied psychology. He worked in Roman Catholic Diocese of Trier as teacher for Roman Catholic priests in divinity school. As professor Hammers worked in sector pastoral psychology.

Hammers wrote 1997 in a study, that around 25% of Roman Catholic priests are gay.

On 21 November 2007 Hammers retired as professor.

== Literature ==
- Parapsychologie und Theologie, 1975
- Christlicher Glaube ... und praktizierter Unglaube, Erfahrungen und Anmerkungen eines Psychotherapeuten, 1996
