= Circus building =

A circus building is where a circus is housed.

It may also refer to:

- Circus (building), a structure in ancient Rome built for spectacles and chariot racing
- Circus Building, an exhibit building at Shelburne Museum, Vermont
