= The General Store, Shelburne =

Coordinates: 44°22′35.6″N 73°13′52.25″W

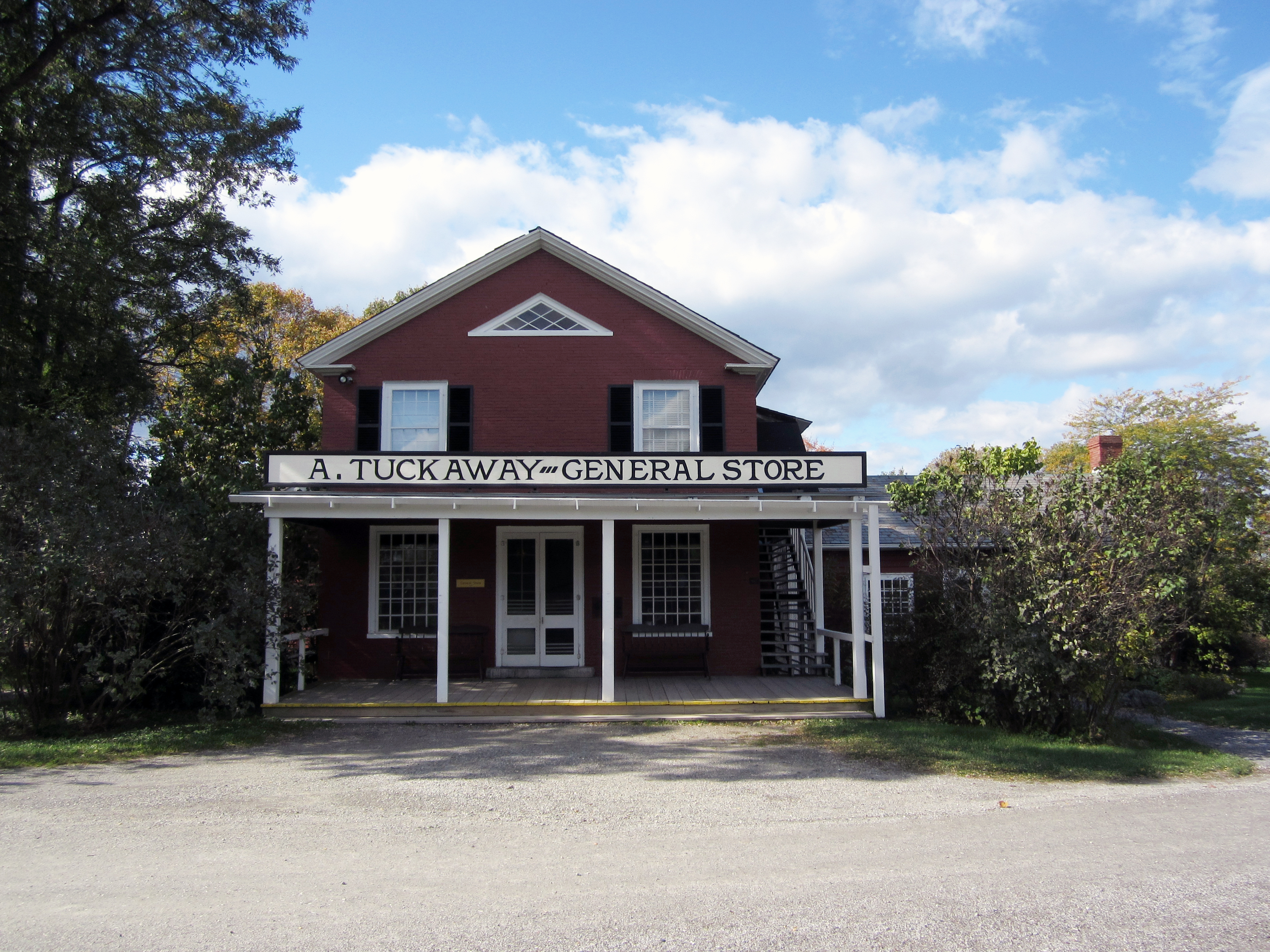
Exterior of the General Store located at the Shelburne Museum.

The General Store, constructed in 1840 in Shelburne, Vermont, originally operated as the village post office. Its front-gable orientation, accentuated with a multi-paned, triangular pedimental window, reflects the popular Greek Revival style.

== History ==
In 1952 the Shelburne Museum rolled the building to the grounds on a specially laid railroad track. The first level re-creates a late nineteenth-century general store with fully stocked shelves displaying the types of goods available for purchase. Smaller adjoining rooms offer a variety of community services including a post office, a barbershop, and a taproom. The adjacent wing houses a replication of a nineteenth-century Apothecary Shop that the museum added after moving the building to the grounds.

The building’s second story exhibits medical equipment, tools, and furnishings spanning the first half of the 20th century. Replicated settings include a dentist’s laboratory and examining room, the offices of an ophthalmologist, and those of an ear, nose, and throat physician.

== See also ==
- Electra Havemeyer Webb
