= Vermont House =

Vermont House may refer to:

- Vermont House of Representatives
- Shelburne Museum Vermont House, Shelburne, Vermont
- Vermont House and Fenton Grain Elevator, Fenton, Michigan
