= Beach Lodge and Gallery =

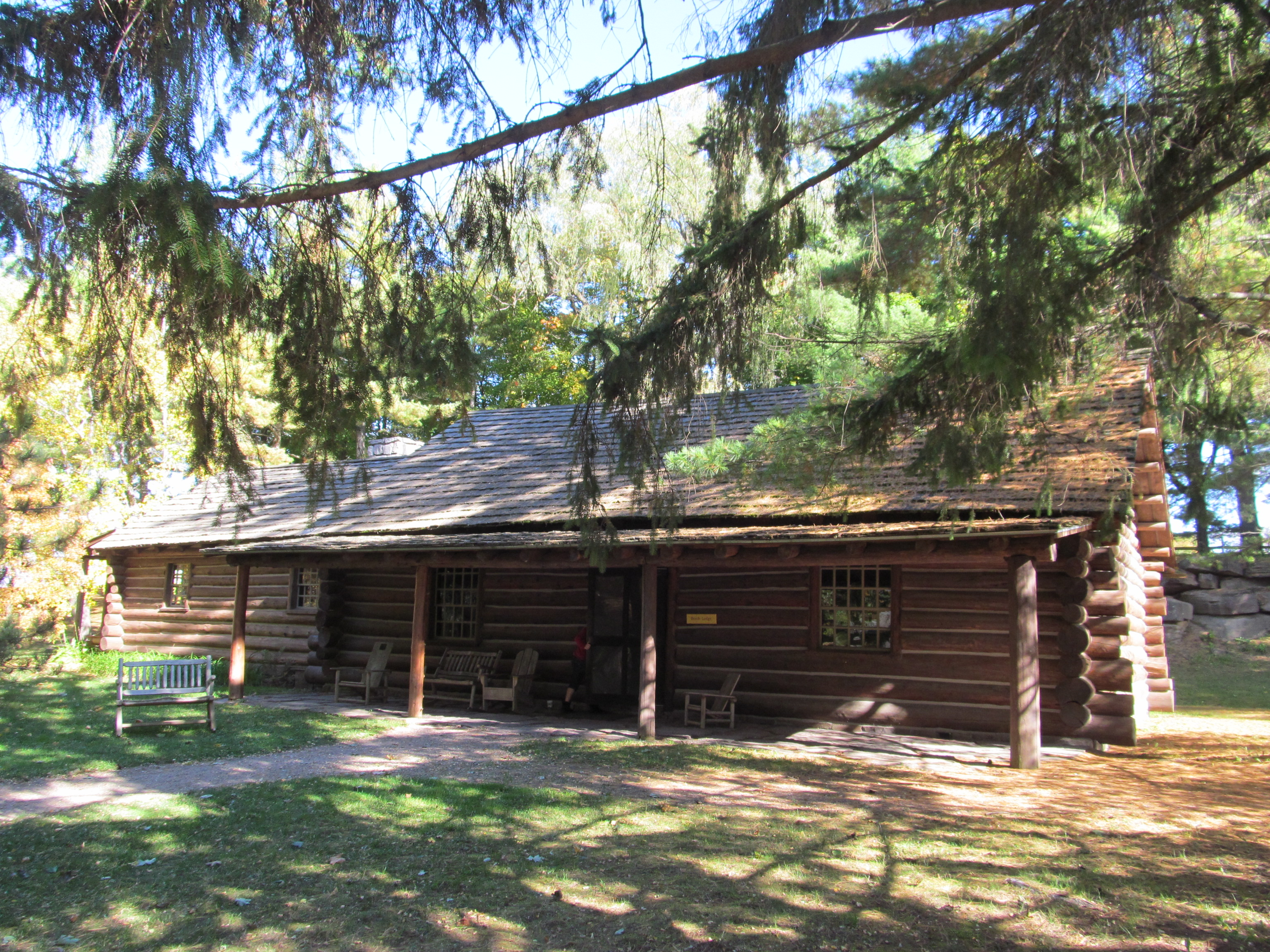
Beach Lodge

The Beach Gallery (44.373832°N 73.233013°W) and Beach Lodge (44.374149°N 73.232782°W) are two exhibit buildings at the Shelburne Museum in Shelburne, Vermont, United States. They are both made from logs and are designed to resemble an Adirondack hunting camp. The Beach Lodge exhibits a large selection of hunting trophies (taxidermy), while the Beach Gallery exhibits art depicting the North American wilderness; this includes work by Carl Rungius (a hunting companion of Theodore Roosevelt), Arthur Fitzwilliam Tait, and Sydney Laurence.

== History ==
In 1960, the Shelburne Museum commissioned the construction of the Beach Lodge and the Beach Gallery, named for William and Marie Beach, who were friends and hunting companions of Electra Havemeyer Webb, as well as Shelburne Museum patrons. Using timber forested at the Webb family's Adirondack "great camp", Nehasane, the museum designed the Lodge and the Gallery to resemble an Adirondack hunting camp. To create an environment distinctly different from the rest of the grounds, the museum excavated a shallow basin in which to build the two structures, surrounded the basin with Vermont sandstone, and planted spruce, hemlock, and cedar trees so that the area would resemble an Adirondack forest.

In 2007 the museum restored both the Beach Lodge and Gallery. The Lodge, whose original timber structure and interior remained in good condition, received basic renovations, while the Gallery, which had drastically deteriorated over the years, had to be razed. The museum constructed a new cabin using logs from the timber left standing after a forest fire in Montana on the Gallery's original floor plan.

== See also ==
- Trophy hunting
