= Shaker Shed =

American museum exhibit

Coordinates: 44°22′41.03″N 73°13′48.88″W

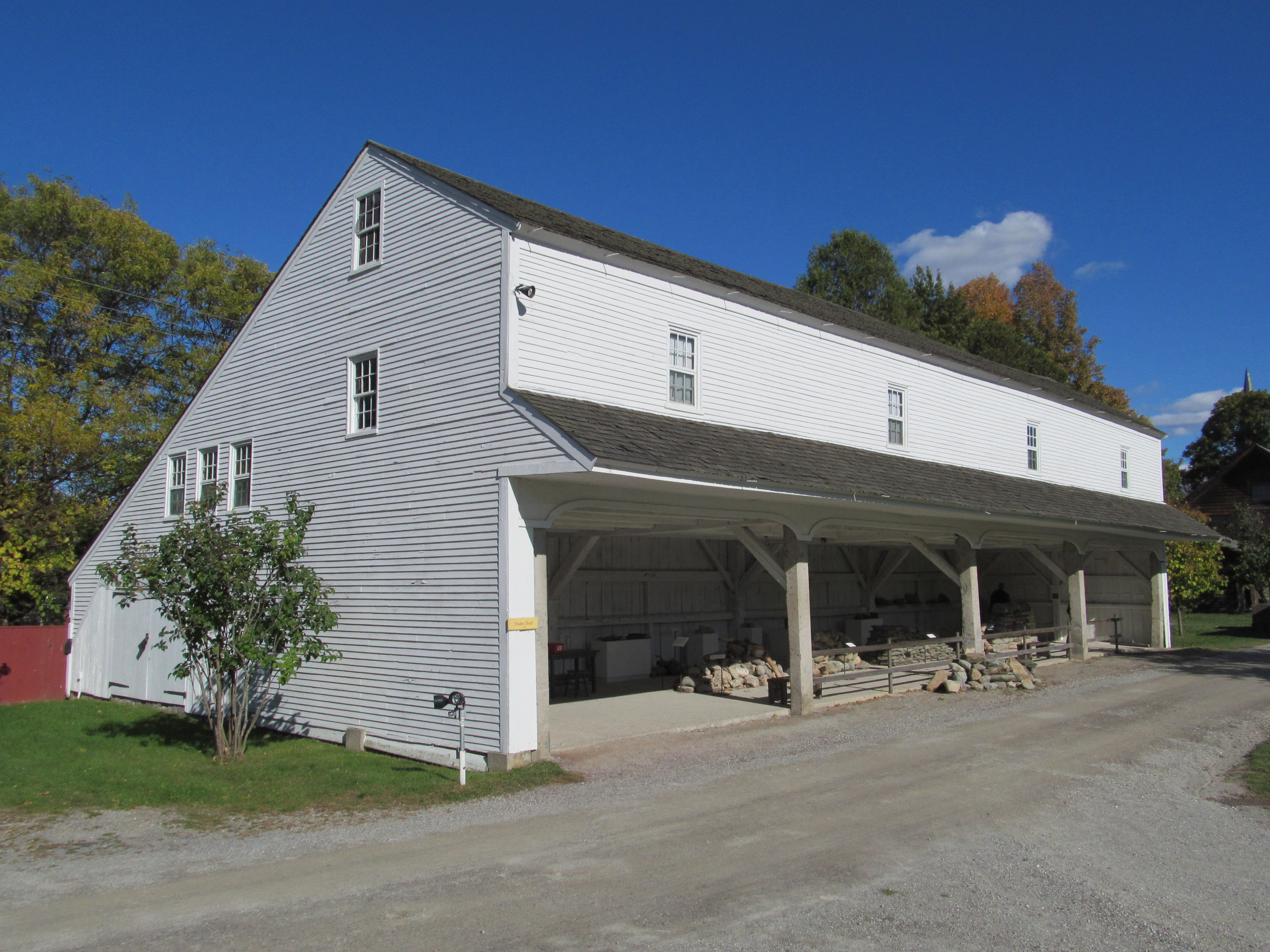
Shaker Shed

The Shaker Shed is an exhibit building at Shelburne Museum in Shelburne, Vermont. It exhibits the museum's collection of hand-tools and household equipment.

== Background ==
The Shaker Shed, an unornamented structure, originally served Canterbury Shaker Village, a large Shaker community in Canterbury, New Hampshire. Dubbed "Shakers" because of the frenetic dancing involved in their worship service, their religious sect was formally known as the United Society of Believers in the First and Second Appearance of Christ. Guided by self-sufficiency, hard work, and celibacy, the Shakers were widely known in the nineteenth century for the quality of their crafts and garden products. They produced unadorned and finely crafted furnishings, seeds, and herbal medicines for the community, which they eventually sold nationwide by wagon and by mail.

== History ==
Built in 1840 as a one-story horse and carriage stand, the shed has five granite pillars, visible between the carriage bays, which strengthen the heavy timber framework. The original proprietors enlarged the basic structure twice over a period of thirteen years: in 1850 an addition of one and a half upper stories provided storage space for brooms made and sold by the Canterbury community, and in 1853 the Shakers added a shed to the rear of the building to store their farm machinery.

=== Relocation ===
The Shelburne Museum moved the Shaker Shed to the grounds in 1951 to serve as exhibition space for the collection of hand-tools and household equipment.

== Collection ==
Shelburne Museum’s collection of woodworking tools encompasses a wide variety of hand tools and machinery that craftspeople, such as carpenters, joiners, cabinetmakers, and coopers, used to provide essential goods and services to their local communities. Craftsmen, who worked primarily with readily available, native woods, required specialized tools to create their products.

To construct buildings, early settlers would fell trees using axes and shape the logs into heavy, squared lumber with adzes. They would then interlock the lumber using mortise and tenon joints, secured with wooden pins, to create a structure's frame. Unlike iron nails, the wooden pins would expand and contract with the building's frame. All of the museum's historic structures, but most clearly the second floor of the Horseshoe Barn, reflect mortise and tenon joinery.

The American building trade became highly specialized: sawyers would work in teams to saw boards and planks from felled timber; carpenters would frame houses, lay floors, and build staircases; joiners focused on finer work, such as fitting joints, framing doors and windows, and preparing paneling, moldings and trim; while cabinetmakers, who employed many of the same skills as joiners, created chests-of-drawers, desks, tables, and other furniture.

Planes, used to prepare surfaces, fit joints, and cut particular decorative shapes for moldings and trim, remained the most specialized tool that woodworkers used. Craftsmen developed dozens of different planes for precise use. A typical joiner or cabinetmaker's tool chest contained twenty to fifty planes.

Coopering, or barrel making, remained an important occupation through the nineteenth century. Using froes to split barrel staves and curved "sun" planes to shape the ends of mounted staves, coopers produced containers of all sizes. Ranging from small water and liquor kegs to 206-gallon hogsheads, their barrels stored goods including tobacco, whale oil, whiskey, molasses, flour, apples, sugar, and hardware. Household appliances such as water tubs, sap buckets, butter churns, milk pails, and drinking or ladling mugs called piggins, reflected the extensive reach of a cooper's trade. The United States 1850 census recorded 43,000 practicing coopers, but by the late nineteenth century, the introduction of metal drums and other machine-made storage and shipping containers greatly diminished the demand for wooden cooperage, so that today the craft is almost nonexistent.

The inaccessibility of processed metals in early American meant that people incorporated wood into all aspects of construction, including plumbing. Early American underground water pipes were made of cedar or pine logs that had been cut while still green, hollowed out with special augers and fitted together. They linked supply sources such as springs or reservoirs with homes and businesses. These pump logs were virtually indestructible so that some were still used in Philadelphia as late as the 1950s.
