= Charlotte Meeting House =

Building in Vermont, United States

Coordinates: 44°22′37.98″N 73°13′52.36″W

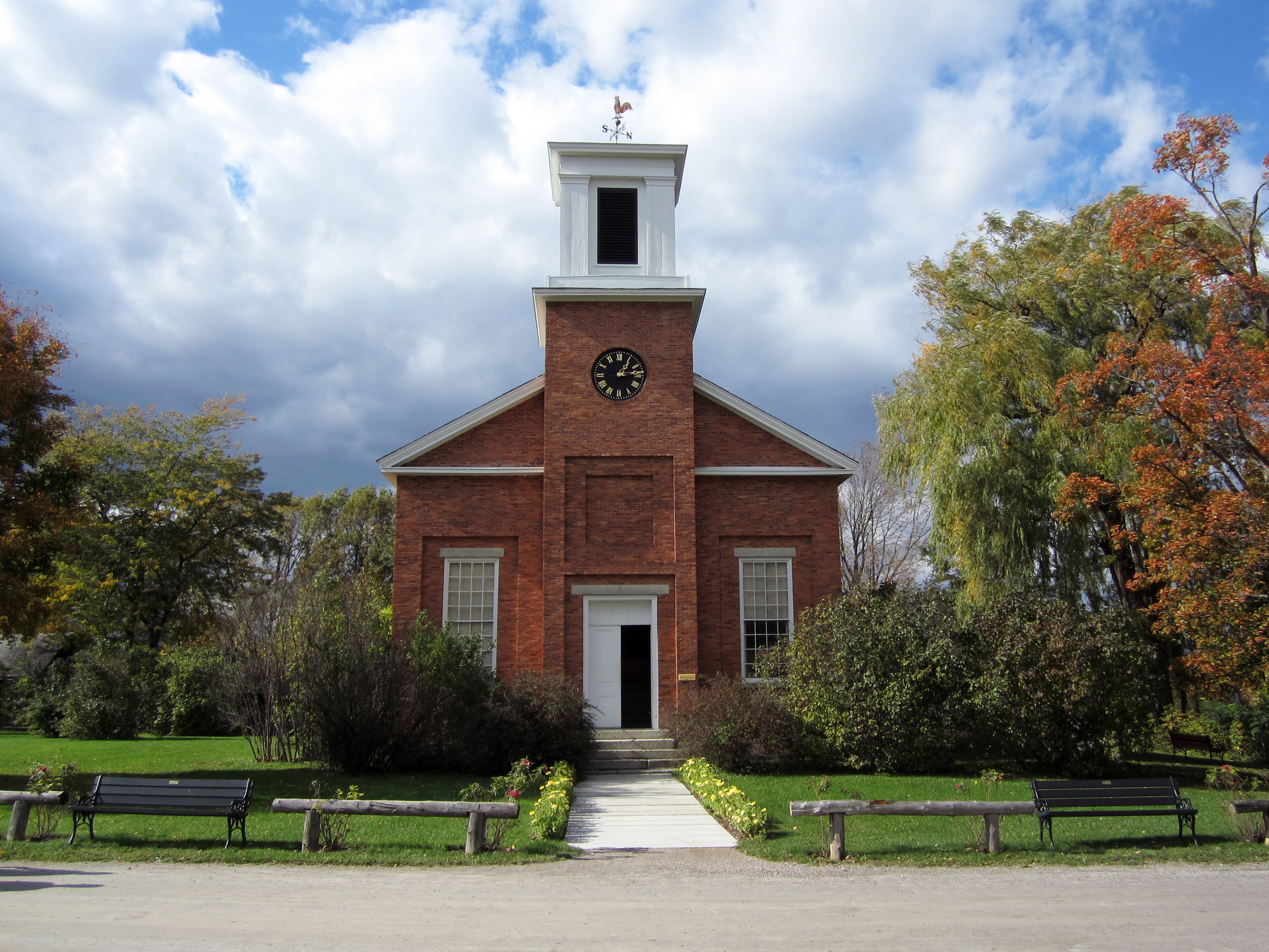
Exterior of the Charlotte Meeting House located at the Shelburne Museum

The Charlotte Meeting House was built in 1840 by the Methodist congregation of Charlotte, Vermont. In 1952 it was moved to the Shelburne Museum in Shelburne, Vermont. It now serves as an exhibit building on the museum grounds.

== History ==
The building was originally erected by the Charlotte Methodist Church in 1840, after their original wooden structure was destroyed in a fire in 1837.

By 1899 it had ceased to function as a church and was taken over by a group of thirteen young women who had formed an amateur theatrical group and used the building as a playhouse. In 1902, the group incorporated as the Breezy Point Library Association and bought the building to serve as the town library. Charles W. Henry, Vermont's foremost painted theater curtain artist, often painted backdrops for the association's productions.

After a windstorm damaged the building in 1950, the association voted to sell it to the Shelburne Museum so that it could be preserved. In 1952, the Shelburne Museum dismantled the building and moved it to its grounds, finding replacements for missing or damaged elements, including the belfry, pews, and pulpit, in an abandoned church in Milton, Vermont. The interior plaster walls were painted in tones of white and grey to resemble paneled woodwork (see Trompe-l'œil).

== Architecture ==
The structure reflects the stylistic tendencies established in the last decade of the 18th century when the church plan became the standard on which meeting houses were designed. The church plan refers to a rectangular structure with a pitched roof and incorporated bell tower, with the entrance located along the structure's short axis and the pulpit positioned opposite. Since the church plan and the word "church" connoted Anglicanism, Puritan communities used the term "meeting house" to refer to the building they used for both secular and religious meetings.

Puritans, and later Congregationalists, traditionally constructed their meeting houses on a square or rectangular plan with hipped roofs, a separate bell tower, and the entrance and pulpit situated on the long sides of the building. By the late eighteenth century, as communities began to distinguish between meeting houses and churches, Protestant communities adopted both the title "church" and the associated plan in designing their religious buildings.

The Meeting House's triangular pediment, accented with cornice moldings, reflects the pervasiveness of Greek Revival architecture in the mid-nineteenth century. The lack of other adornment, typical of the Greek Revival style, lent itself well to New England Protestant architecture.
