= Prentis House =

Coordinates: 44°22′34″N 73°13′52″W

The Prentis House, built in 1773 in Hadley, Massachusetts, by the Dickinson family, is typical of the indigenous style of saltbox architecture that developed in New England during the Colonial period and remained in use, particularly in rural areas, through the American Revolution. The Prentis House was relocated to the Shelburne Museum in Shelburne, Vermont, and furnished with 17th and 18th century period furniture and decorative arts.

Saltbox architecture developed as builders devised a simple way to enlarge a two-story frame building. The term "saltbox" refers to the structure's characteristic asymmetrical roofline that extends on one side from the peak of the roof to the first floor, thus resembling the profile of an early wooden salt container. Builders would typically position a saltbox structure so that the extended roof faced north, diminishing the impact of winter winds, while the façade windows faced south, collecting warmth from the sun.

Typical of the style, Prentis House is built around a massive central chimney. Seven flues meet on the second floor in a huge beehive-shaped formation before the chimney narrows again at the roofline.
