= Stencil House =

Coordinates: 44°22′35.51″N 73°13′50.98″W

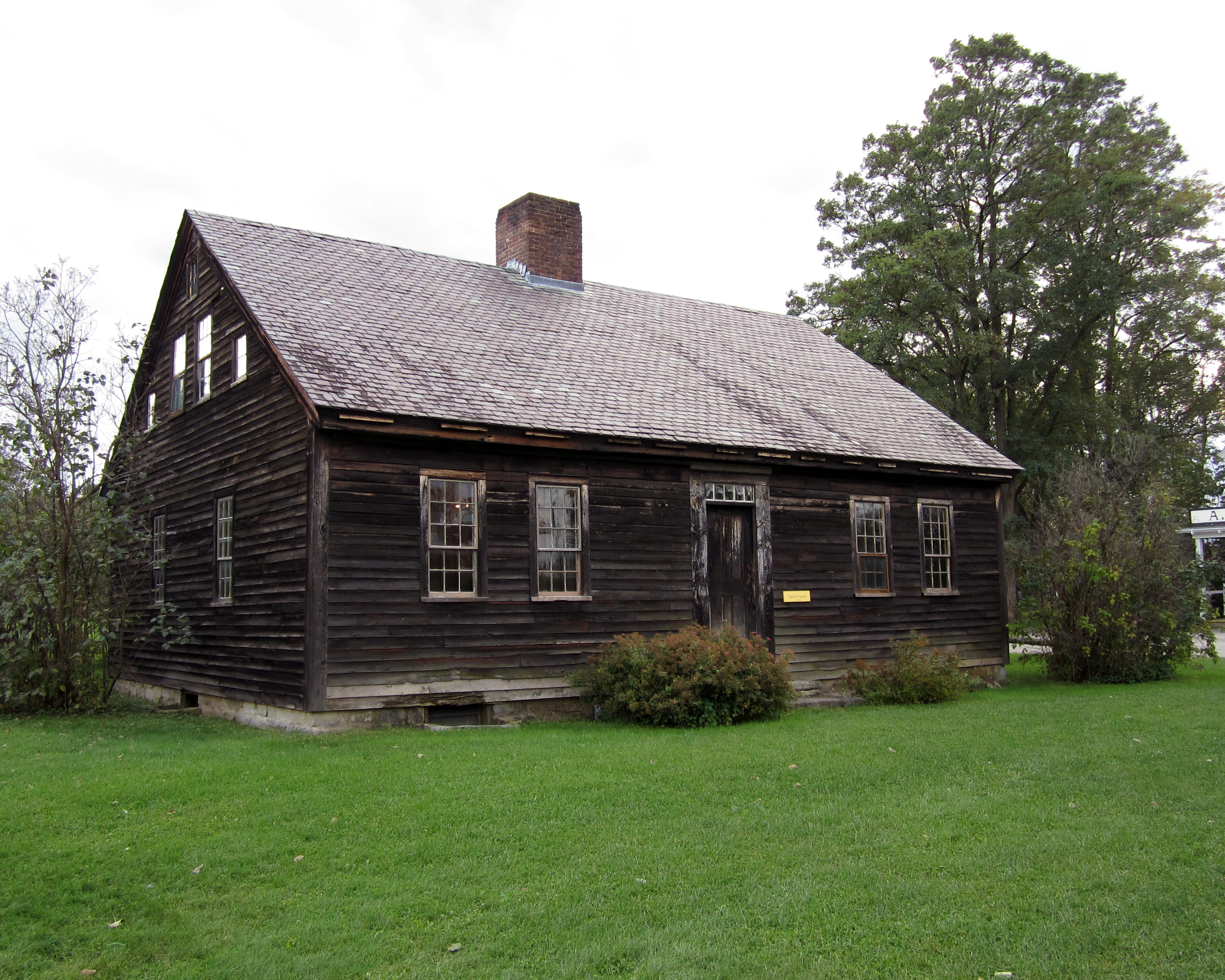
Exterior of the Stencil House located at the Shelburne Museum.

Stencil House, built in 1804 on one hundred-acre farm in Columbus, New York, was modeled after a Capen house, a small, side-gabled structure prevalent throughout the colonies in the 17th and 18th centuries. Named after Parson Joseph Capen of Topsfield, Massachusetts, who built one of the earliest such structures in 1692, Capen houses reflect the British influence on early Puritan architecture. The house is now an 18th-century period historic house museum located at the Shelburne Museum in Shelburne, Vermont.

== History ==
Built around a large central fireplace that opened on multiple sides to maximize warmth, Capen houses, like their medieval English counterparts, typically possessed three or four rooms on the ground floor: a parlor, a “hall,” a kitchen, and sometimes a foyer. The parlor traditionally functioned as a formal space and was not heated in the winter except on special occasions. The kitchen and hall acted as communal living spaces. The stairwell, not yet considered a focal point of design, remained a discreet and functional element of the house's plan. While American colonists maintained the basic floor plan of the European houses, the ready and cheap supply of timber allowed them to use clapboard siding and shingled roofs rather than the mud and thatch common in Britain.

Although Stencil House was constructed along this basic plan, the interior reflects a 19th-century decorum rather than the Puritan simplicity of earlier Capen Houses. The parlor maintains its position as a reception room and while the “hall” has become a formal dining room. Only the kitchen, at the rear of the structure, maintains its original use as a communal family area.

The extensive stenciling in the foyer, parlor, and dining room augment these formal embellishments. When the museum acquired the building in 1953, wallpaper obscured the extensive stenciling. Before moving the house to the museum, workers removed several layers of peeling paper, revealing the scope of the painted decoration beneath. Rather than confining motifs to borders, the Stencil House artist had covered entire walls, working directly on boards rather than on plaster walls. This work was probably completed sometime between 1810 and 1830. Many of the stenciled designs in this house are identical to those found on the walls of the Farmersville Tavern, Farmersville, New York.

== Collection ==
=== Wall treatments ===
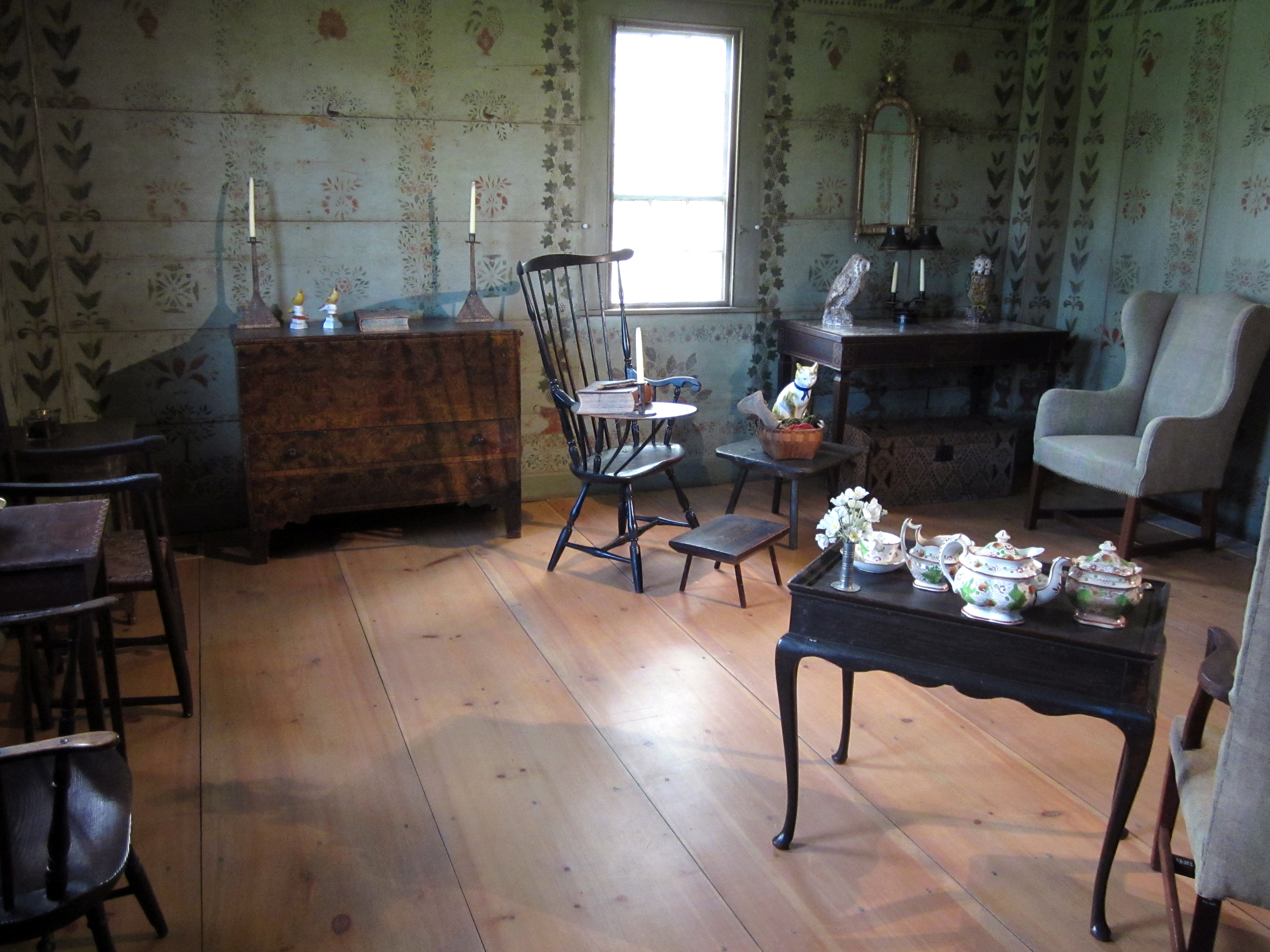
Interior of the Stencil House. Stencil wall treatments can be seen in the background.

Nineteenth-century American homeowners employed many methods in ornamenting their interiors. Rich paint colors and wallpaper were widely available in America as early as 1725 and by 1830 thousands of trade painters offered wallpapering, mural painting, and stenciling among their marketable talents. Shelburne Museum's collection includes examples of all three types of wall treatments.

Members of the upper class often imported French and English wallpaper to adorn formal rooms such as parlors, ballrooms, and dining rooms. These papers frequently represented scenic landscapes and possessed bright colors and bold patterning that could stand out even in weak candlelight.

Mural painting offered an equally decorative but less expensive mode of adornment for those who could not afford to import expensive papers. Jonathan Poor, and his partner, Paine, worked as limners. Traveling around Maine, they offered their services as decorative painters charging $10 for a completed room. Represented in the museum's collection is an ornamental over-mantel and chimney-surround that Poor and Paine created in about 1830. Designed as part of a painted chamber of landscape murals, these paintings, with their views of busy harbors, farms, and forests, are outstanding examples of a decorative technique that is frequently lost to demolition.

In the early nineteenth century, itinerant artists would stencil walls in exchange for room and board. These artists would cut patterns from thin wood or heavy paper and use them to decorate walls and furniture. Stencil House's parlor, dining room, and entrance hall exhibit a variety of stenciled patterns, including a grape leaf border, vases of flowers, and patriotic eagles, while Dutton House’s rooms and hallways reflect their original stenciled patterns.
