= Shelburne Museum =

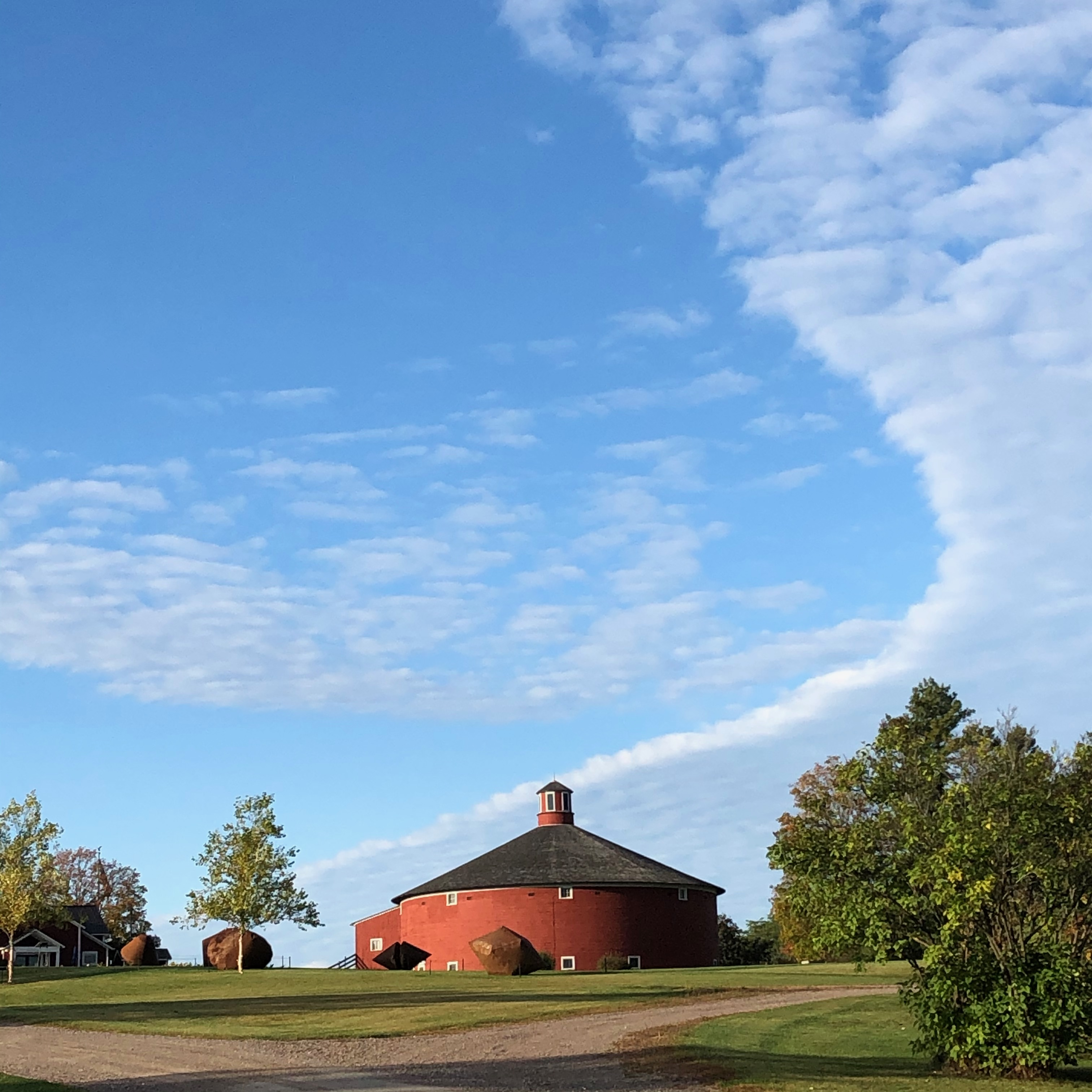
- Shelburne Museum's Round Barn
- Established: 1947
- Location: 6000 Shelburne Road; Shelburne, Vermont, U.S.
- Coordinates: 44.3709°N 73.2315°W
- Type: Museum of art and Americana
- Collection size: >150,000
- Founder: Electra Havemeyer Webb
- Director: Thomas Denenberg
- Website: shelburnemuseum.org

Shelburne Museum is a museum of art, design, and Americana located in Shelburne, Vermont, United States. Over 150,000 works are exhibited in 39 exhibition buildings, 25 of which are historic and were relocated to the museum grounds. It is located on 45 acres (18 ha) near Lake Champlain.

Impressionist paintings, folk art, quilts and textiles, decorative arts, furniture, American paintings, and an array of 17th- to 20th-century artifacts are on view. Shelburne is home to collections of 19th-century American folk art, quilts, 19th- and 20th-century decoys, and carriages.

Electra Havemeyer Webb was a pioneering collector of American folk art, and founded Shelburne Museum in 1947. The daughter of Henry Osborne Havemeyer and Louisine Elder Havemeyer, important collectors of Impressionism, European and Asian art, she exercised an independent eye and passion for art, artifacts, and architecture celebrating a distinctly American aesthetic.

When creating the museum, she took the step of collecting 18th and 19th century buildings from New England and New York in which to display the museum's holdings, relocating 20 historic structures to Shelburne. These include houses, barns, a meeting house, a one-room schoolhouse, a lighthouse, a jail, a general store, a covered bridge, and the 220-foot steamboat Ticonderoga.

In Shelburne Mrs. Webb sought to create "an educational project, varied and alive." Shelburne's collections are exhibited in a village-like setting of historic New England architecture, accented by a landscape that includes over 400 lilacs, a circular formal garden, herb and heirloom vegetable gardens, and perennial gardens.

== History ==
The museum's collection was begun by Electra Havemeyer Webb, one of the first people to recognize the applied and decorative arts of rural America as collectible. Webb was an avid collector of American folk art and founded the museum in 1947. She took the step of relocating historic buildings from New England and New York to Shelburne in which to display the museum's holdings.

The museum has lost money and was said to have had a deficit of more than $300,000 (~$574,192 in 2024) in 1994.

In 1996 the museum sold $30 million (~$55.2 million in 2024) of its art to pay expenses. J. Watson Webb Jr., the son of Electra Havemeyer Webb, resigned in protest. Webb believed that the sale violated the code of ethics of the American Alliance of Museums, which forbids the selling of artworks for purposes other than acquiring more art. The funds from the sale were used to establish a Collections Care Endowment which is used to support the ongoing remedial and preventative conservation, storage and management of the museum's collection.

In 2013, the Pizzagalli Center for Art and Education was opened with two galleries, an auditorium, and a classroom.

In 2023, the Native American Initiative was announced, aiming to construct a building to display and interpret both the materials already in the museum's stewardship, and the Perry Collection, a 200 piece collection of various works by Plains, Prairie, and Southwest groups.

== Collections ==
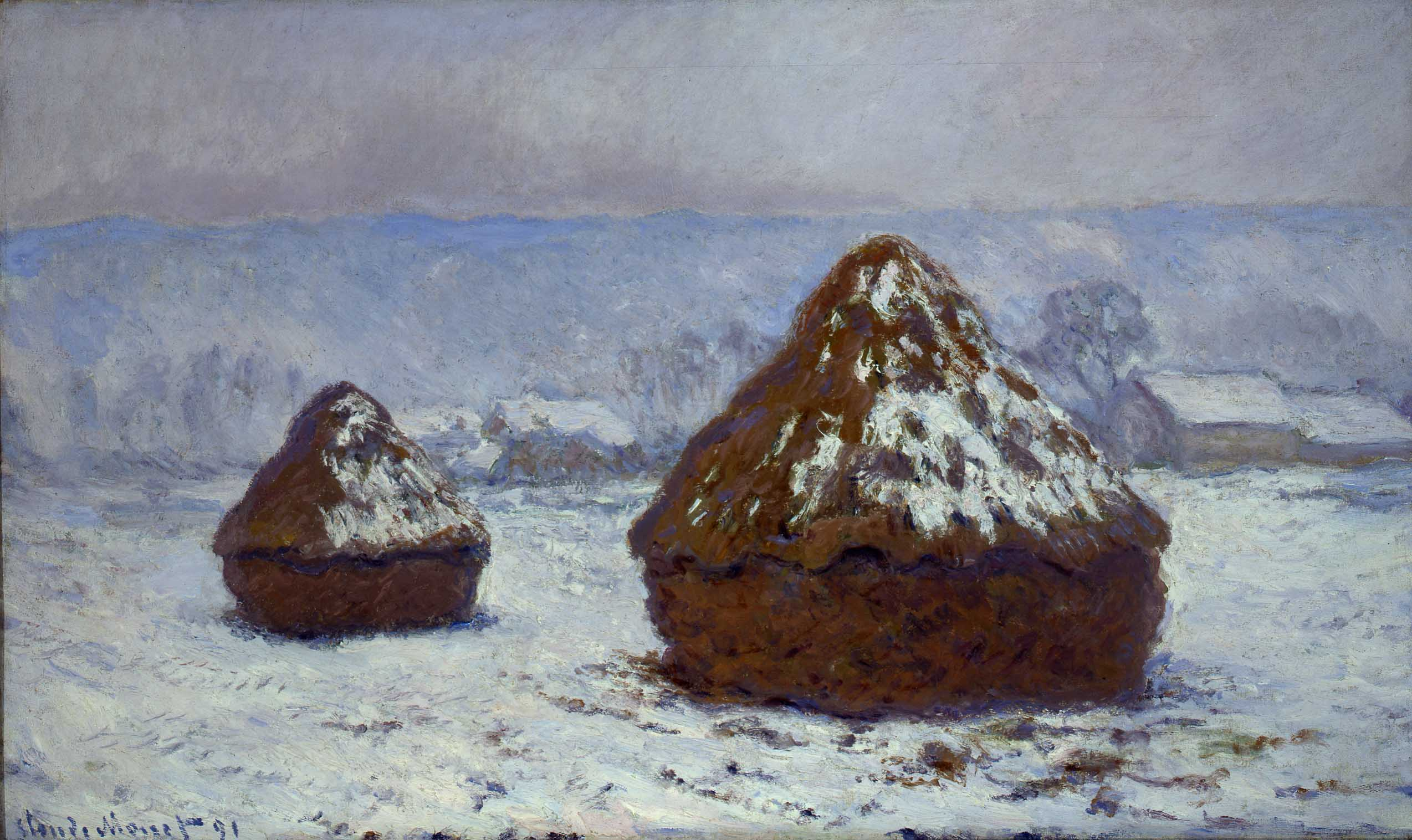
Grainstack, White Frost Effect by Claude Monet, 1890-91

The core of the collection was formed by Electra Havemeyer Webb, a pioneering collector of American folk art who founded Shelburne Museum. Mrs. Webb exchanged ideas with other major early collectors, including Katherine Prentis Murphy, Henry and Helen Flynnt and Henry Francis du Pont (who founded the Winterthur Museum and credited Mrs. Webb with inspiring him to collect American decorative arts).

Since Mrs. Webb's death in 1960, the collections have developed with an emphasis on folk art and contemporary art as it relates to the collection. Artifacts provide insight into the craftsmanship and artistic quality of objects made and used by three centuries of Americans. Visitors experience these objects in galleries and period rooms and through interactive exhibitions and demonstrations. Transportation, farming and trade artifacts illustrate America's industrial development from the 18th to the early 20th centuries. These collections are increasingly relevant to regional audiences from varied backgrounds as the economic base of the community shifts away from farming and small-scale production.

Shelburne's folk art collection includes 1,400 wildfowl decoys and miniature carvings, 150 trade figures and signs, 120 weathervanes and 50 carousel figures, including all 40 animals from an early Dentzel carousel. The circus collection includes 600 historic posters, letters and memorabilia from P.T. Barnum, and the hand-carved 3,500 piece Kirk Brothers Miniature Circus. The Roy Arnold Circus Parade recreates in miniature 112 attractions from the Buffalo Bill Wild West Show, Yankee Circus, and Ringling Bros. and Barnum & Bailey Circus in 525 linear feet of a special exhibition building.

Textiles include 770 bed coverings (including 500 quilts), 400 hooked and sewn rugs, early household textiles (1,800 samplers, laces and linens) and 2,800 costumes and accessories. The decorative arts collection has 6,650 pieces, including glass, ceramics, pewter, metalwork, scrimshaw and one of the country's best regional collections of 18th- and 19th-century painted furniture. Over 1,000 dolls, 27 dollhouses and 1,200 doll accessories echo in miniature the museum's collections of ceramics, furniture and other household furnishings. A major reinterpretation and related publication of the doll collection was completed in 2004. The collection of American and European toys dates from the beginning of the 19th century.

At the museum there are some 3,200 American prints, paintings, drawings and graphics that relate to daily life. American paintings include works by Bierstadt, Cassatt, Chase, Copley, Heade, Homer, Eastman Johnson, Lane, Grandma Moses, Peto and Andrew Wyeth. A significant group of European paintings and pastels from the renowned Havemeyer collection includes works by Corot, Daubigny, Degas, Manet and Monet; they are exhibited in furnished rooms re-created from the Webbs' New York apartment, c. 1930, and are the only Impressionism pictures on public view in Vermont.

Collections also include 225 horse-drawn vehicles (described as one of the best in the nation by Merri Ferrell, formerly curator of vehicles at the Long Island Museum of Art, History and Carriages); 1,000 farming implements; and 5,000 hand tools that document woodworking, metalsmithing, coopering, weaving and spinning, leatherworking and woodcarving trades. Craftspeople staff working exhibits of blacksmithing, printing, spinning and weaving. An apothecary shop/physician's office displays 2,000 patent medicines and turn of the 20th century medical instruments.

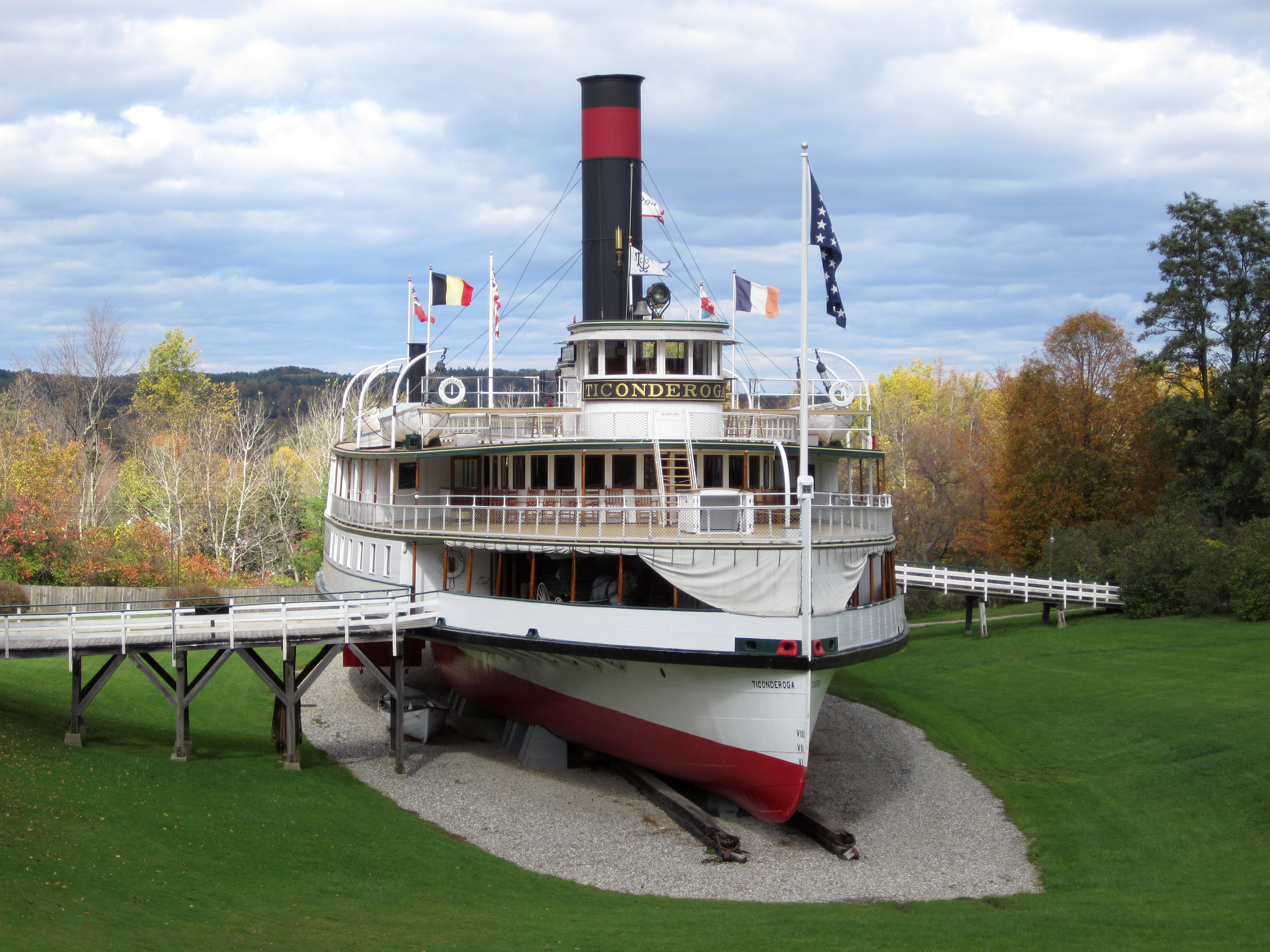
Front view of the Ticonderoga (steamboat) at Shelburne Museum

The collections are exhibited in a setting of 38 exhibition buildings, 25 of which were relocated to the museum; the 1871 Colchester Reef Light; three historic and three replica barns, including a 1901 Vermont round barn; a vintage operating carousel; blacksmith and wheelwright shops; a working exhibit of late 19th-century printing equipment; an 1840 one-room schoolhouse; an 1890 Vermont slate jail; an 1840 general store; a rare 18th-century up-and-down sawmill; a 19th-century covered bridge with two lanes and a footpath; the reconstructed office of noted Vermont physician D. C. Jarvis; an 1890 railroad station; a 1914 steam locomotive and 1890 private rail car; and the 1906 220-foot (67 m) steamboat Ticonderoga, which is a U.S. National Historic Landmark.

== Buildings ==
- Apothecary Shop
- Beach Lodge and Gallery
- Ben Lane Print Shop
- Blacksmith Shop
- Brick House
- Castleton Jail
- Charlotte Meeting House
- Circus Building
- Colchester Reef Lighthouse
- Covered Bridge
- Diamond Barn
- Dorset House
- Dutton House
- Electra Havemeyer Webb Memorial Building
- General Store
- Hat and Fragrance Textile Gallery
- Horseshoe Barn and Annex
- Owl Cottage Activity Center
- Pizzagalli Center for Art and Education
- Pleissner Gallery
- Prentis House
- Rail Car Grand Isle
- Rail Locomotive No. 220
- Round Barn
- Shelburne Museum Cafe
- Shelburne Railroad Station and Freight Shed
- Vergennes Schoolhouse
- Settlers' House
- Shaker Shed
- Stagecoach Inn
- Stencil House
- Stone Cottage and Smokehouse
- Ticonderoga (steamboat)
- The Toy Shop
- Variety Unit
- Vermont House
- Weaving Shop
- Webb Gallery

== Images ==
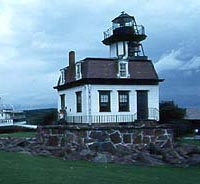
Colchester Reef Light, built in 1871

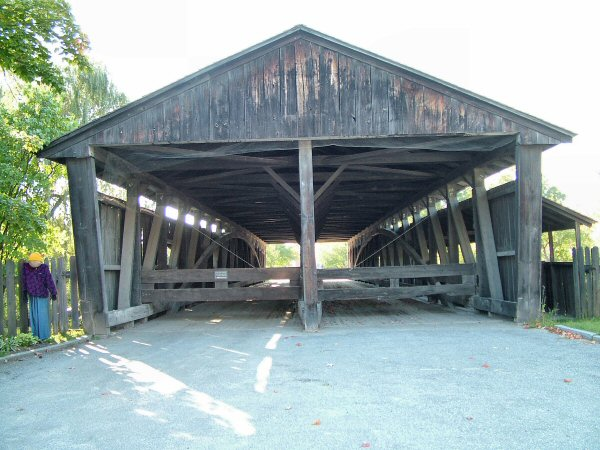
Covered Bridge, built in 1845

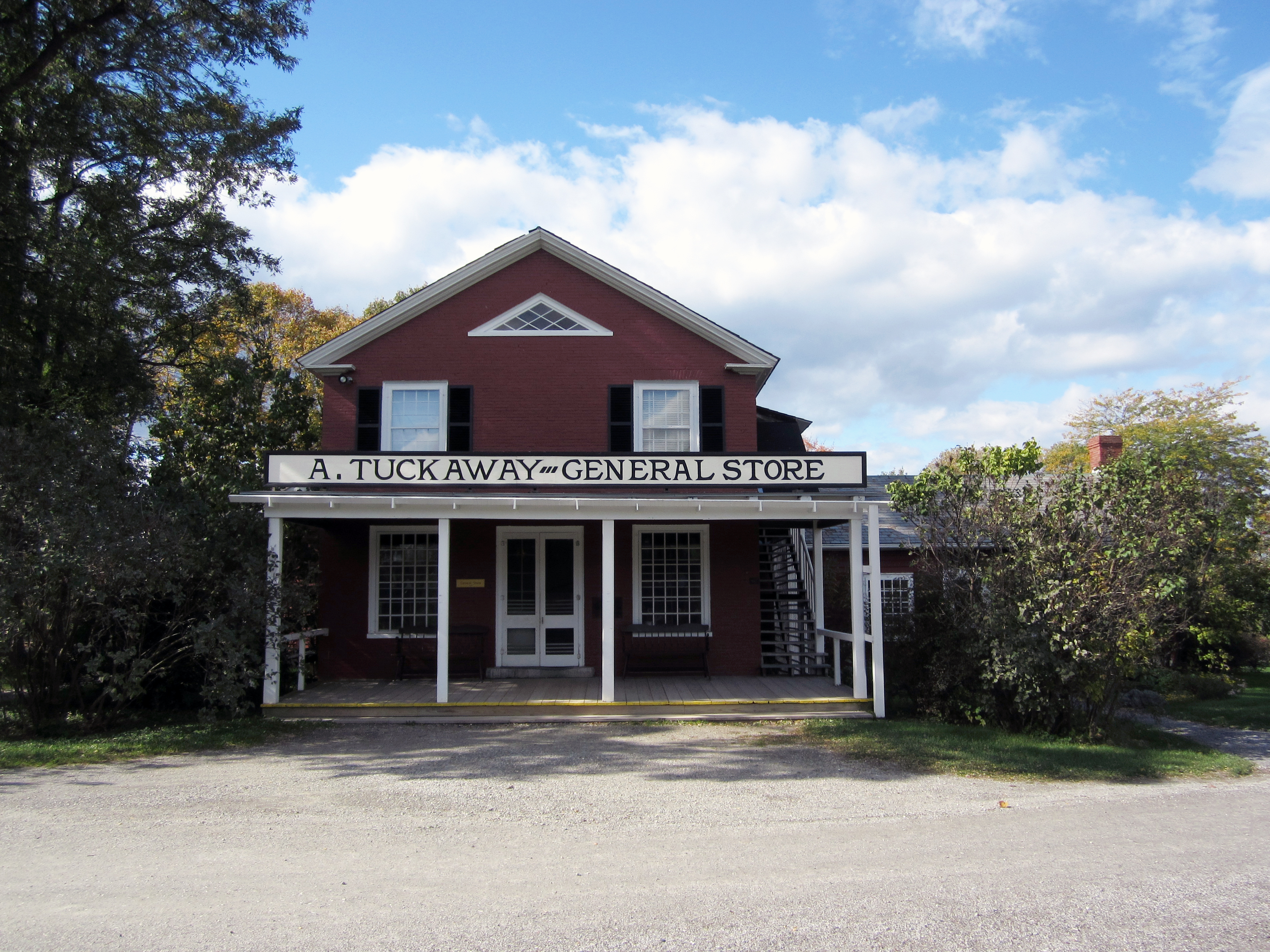
General Store, built 1840

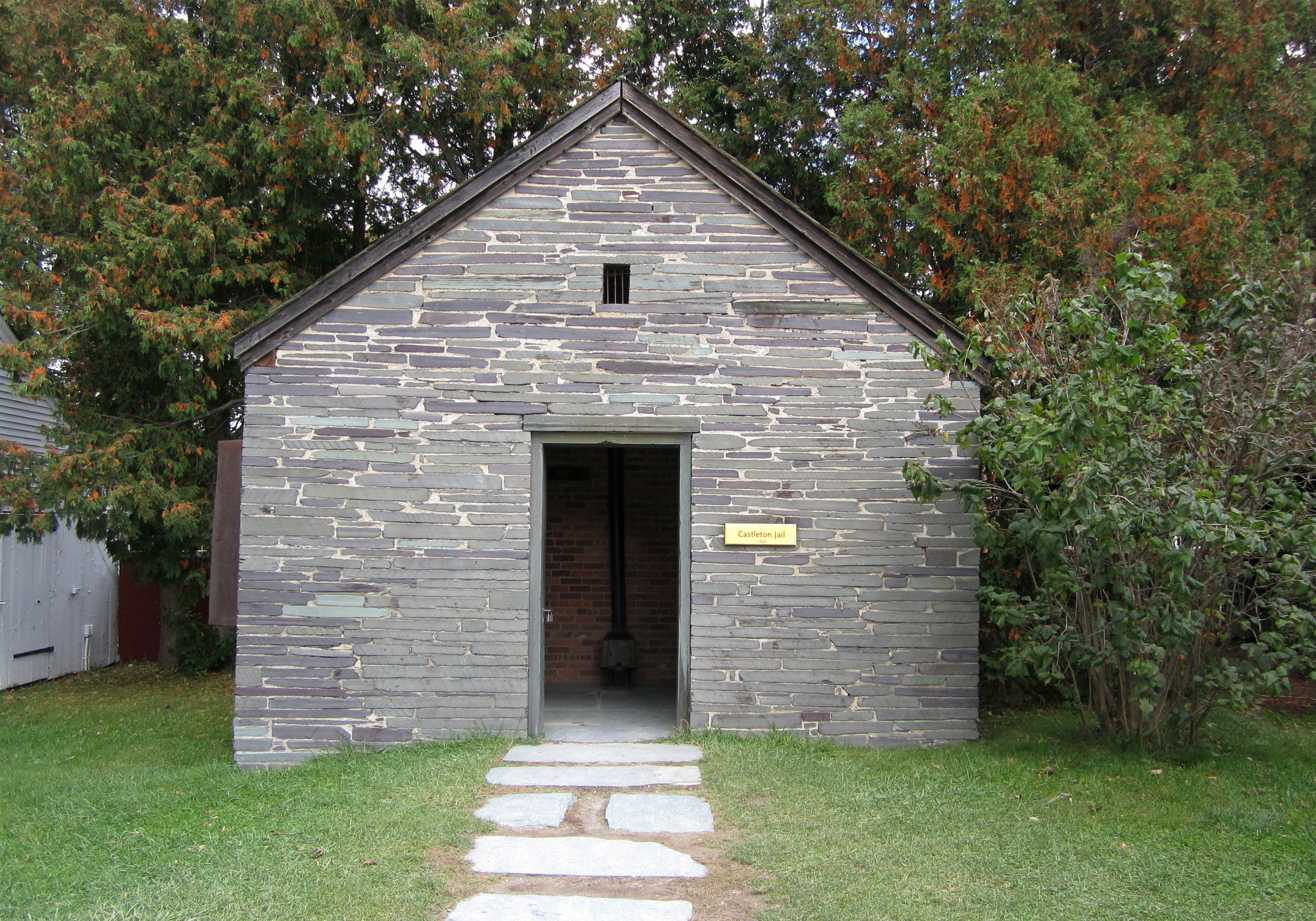
Castleton Jail, built in 1890

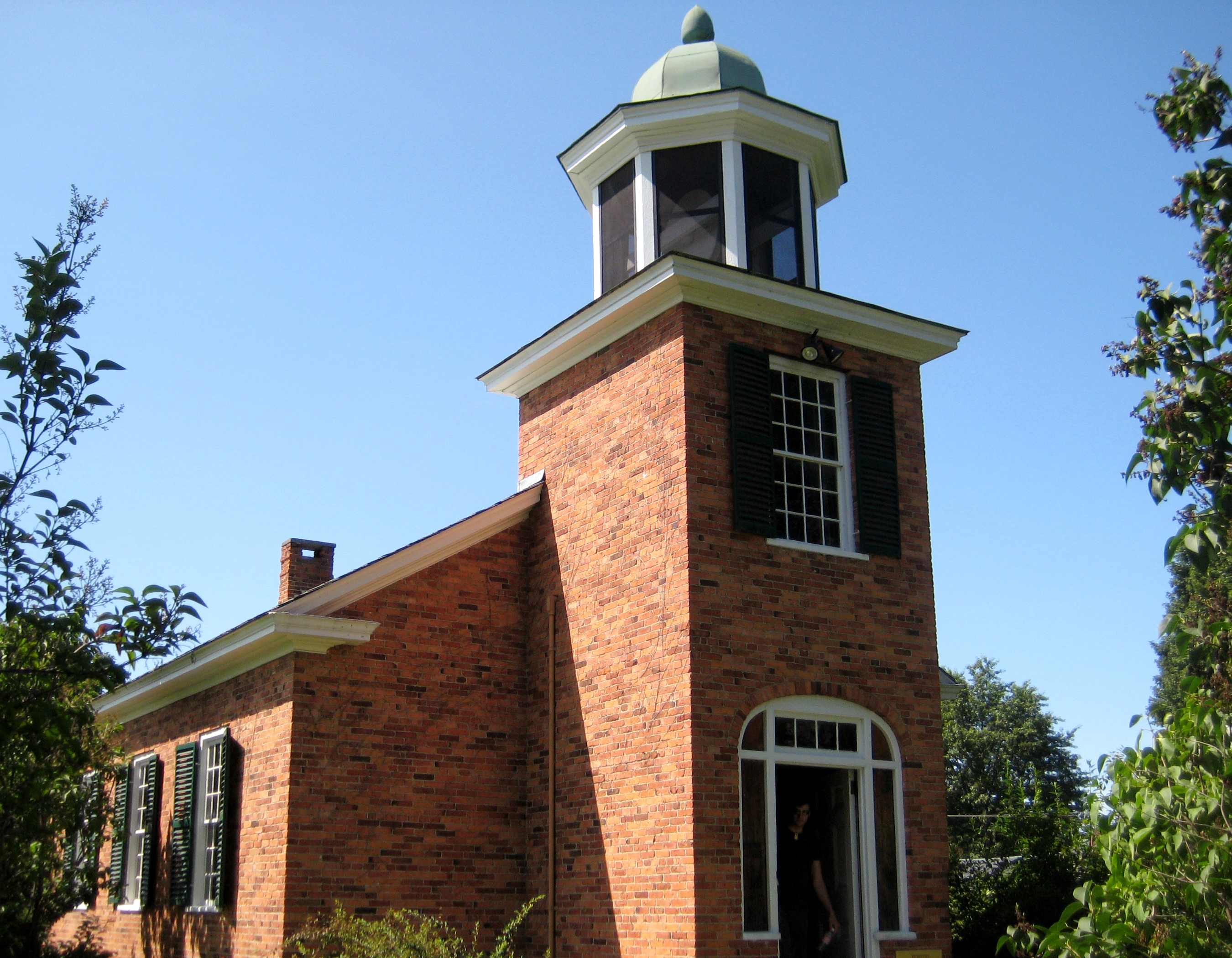
Vergennes Schoolhouse, built c. 1840

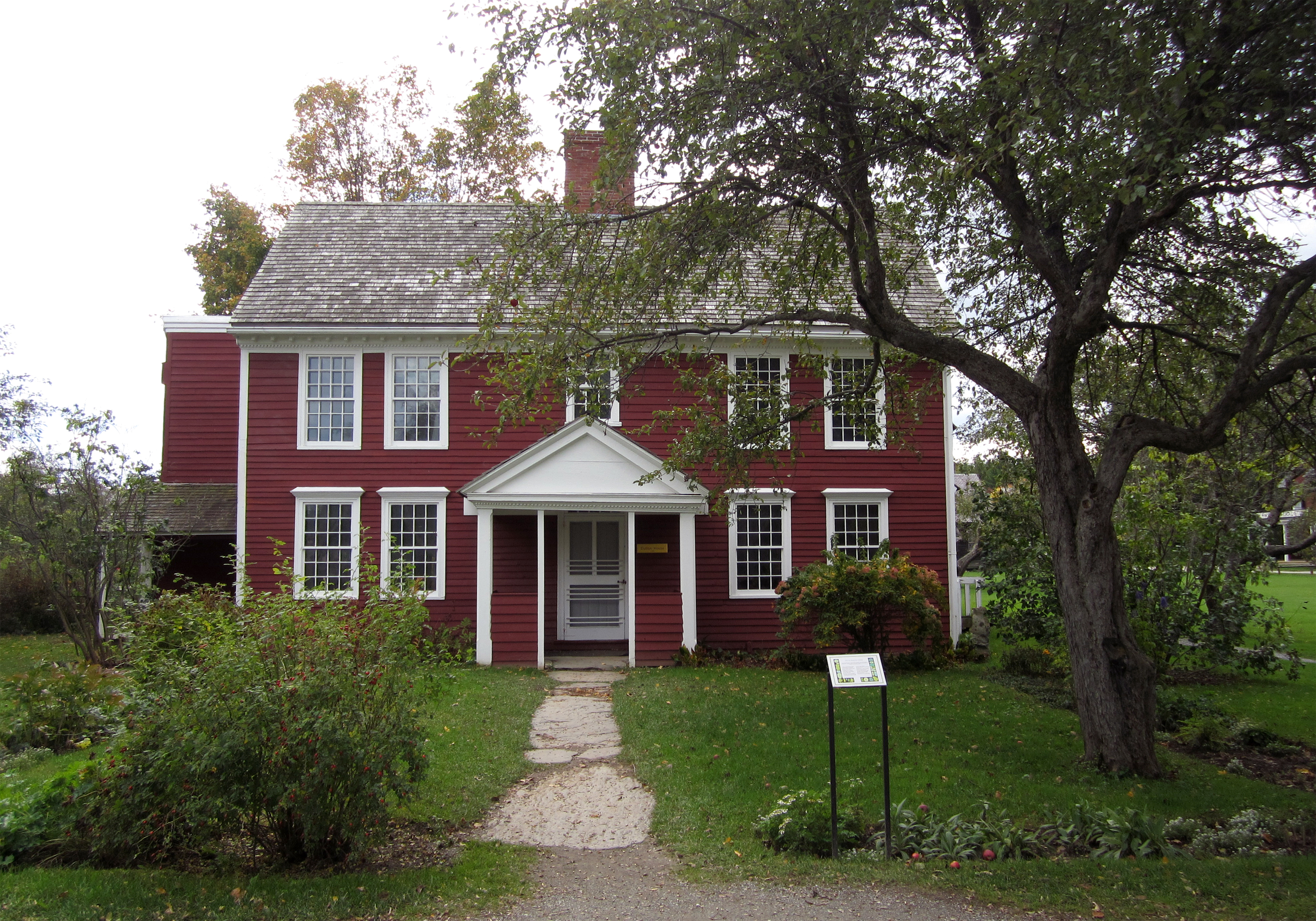
Dutton House, built in 1782

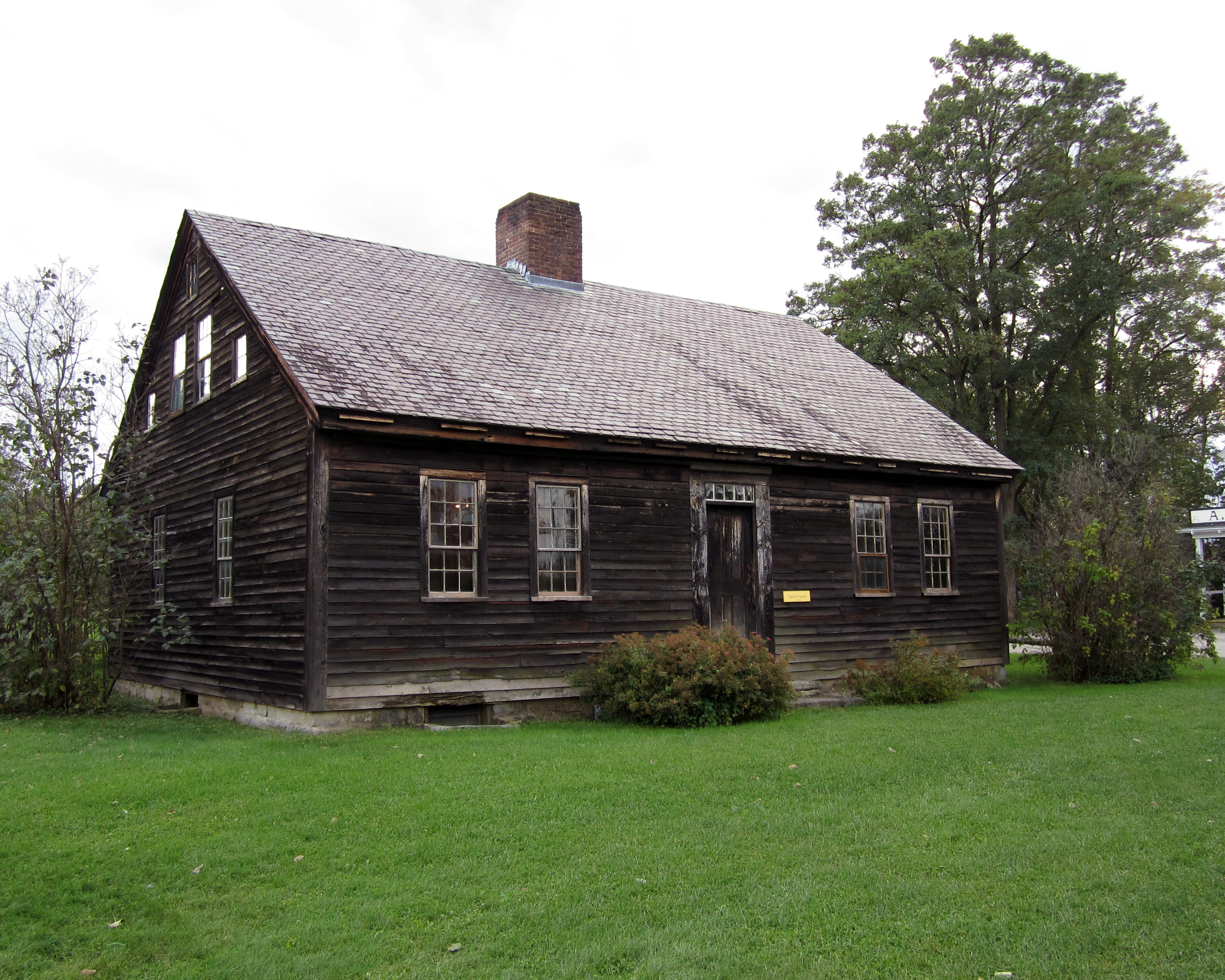
Stencil House, built c. 1804

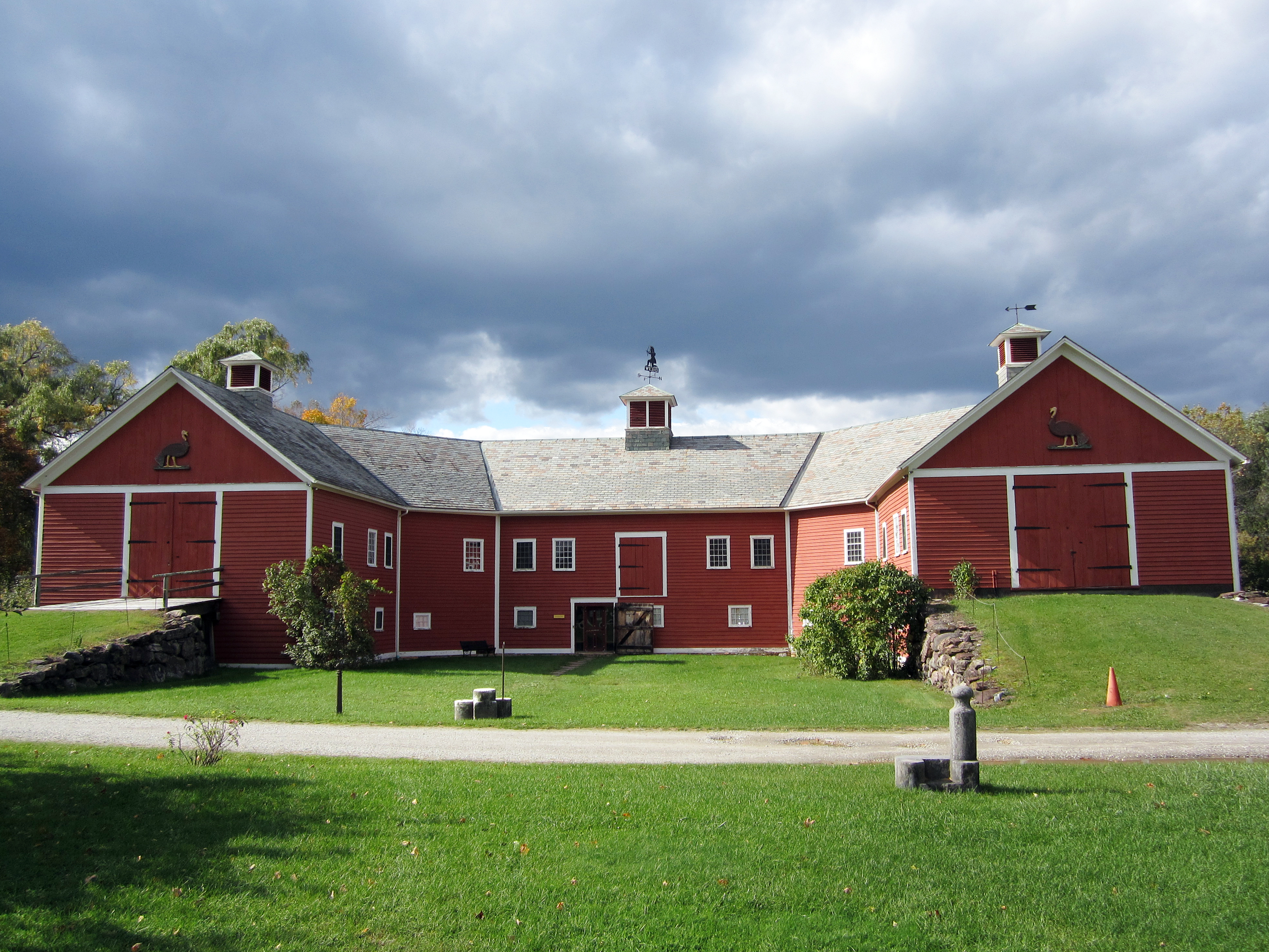
Horseshoe Barn, built 1947-1949

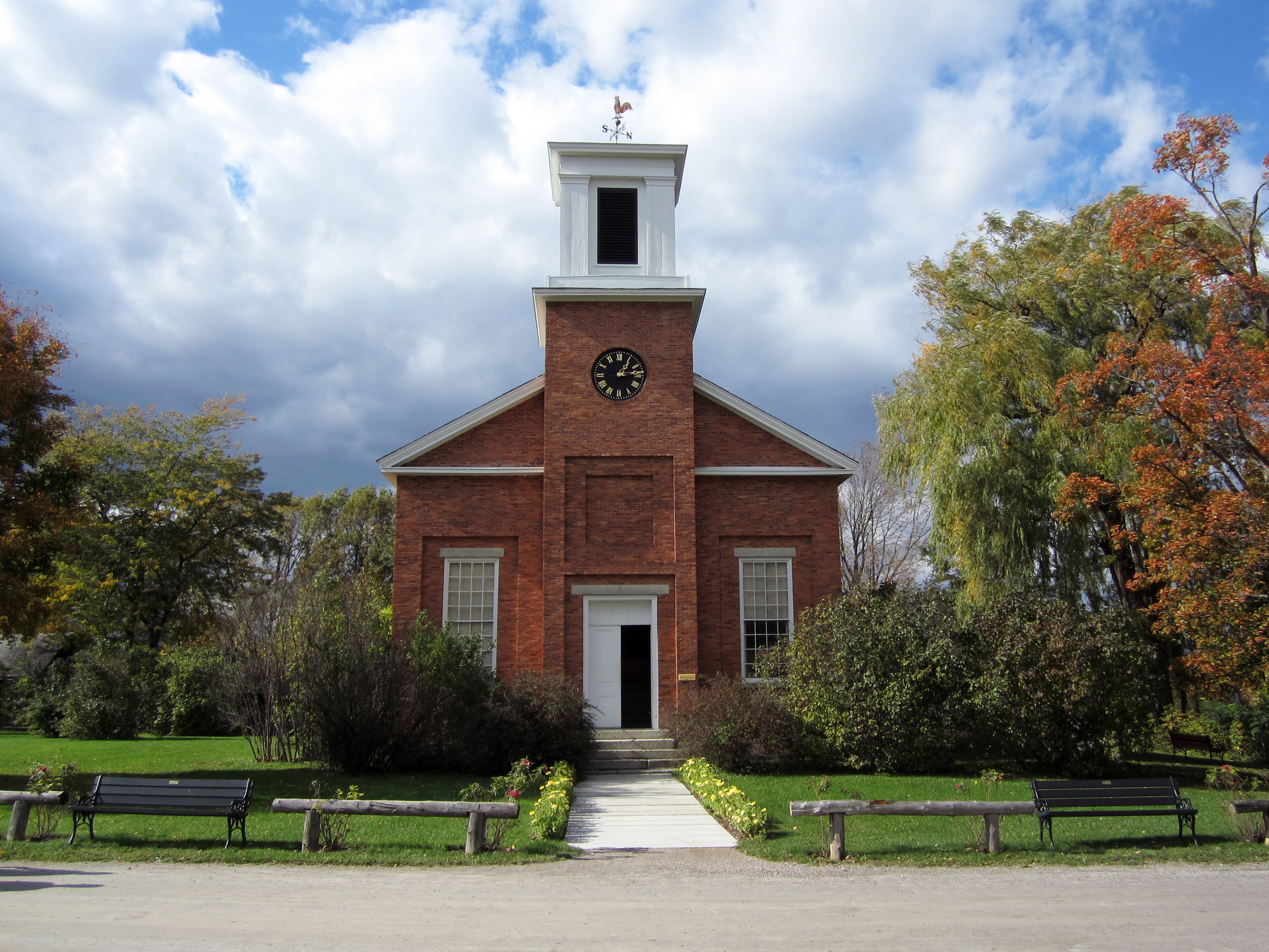
Charlotte Meeting House, built in 1840

== See also ==
- List of Vermont museums
