= Vergennes Schoolhouse =

Coordinates: 44°22′38.75″N 73°13′45.16″W

The Schoolhouse
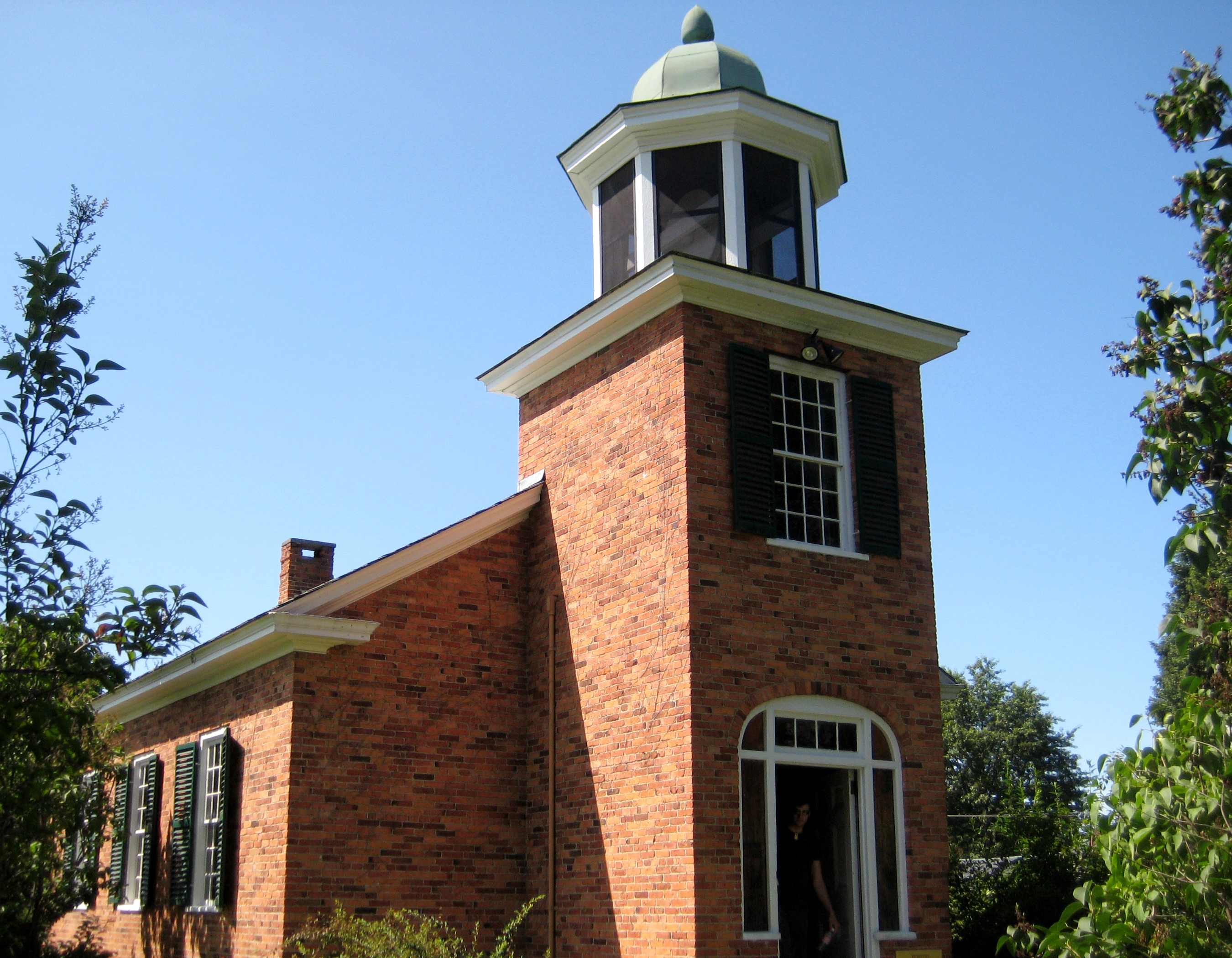
- Interactive map of the The Schoolhouse area

General information
- Status: Museum exhibit
- Architectural style: Greek Revival / Eclectic
- Location: Shelburne Museum, Shelburne, Vermont
- Opening: 1947 (at current site)

The Schoolhouse is an exhibit building at the Shelburne Museum in Shelburne, Vermont. It was originally located in Vergennes, Vermont.

== History ==
The town of Vergennes, Vermont built the schoolhouse about 1840 on land leased from General Samuel Strong, a War of 1812 officer and descendant of one of Addison County’s first families. In the terms of the lease, Strong stipulated that the town pay him an annual rent of one kernel of Indian corn and use the property for educational purposes.

The schoolhouse, although built at the height of Greek Revival’s popularity, reflects an amalgamation of architectural styling. Moderate classical elements include the arched door, sash windows, and projecting bell tower, while the split-gable and octagonal shape of the bell tower’s cupola reflect 19th-century Eclecticism that developed as local builders and craftsmen freely combined elements from different architectural styles. On the exterior, the bricklayer ornamented the one-room structure with a simple patterning of six rows of stretchers (horizontally laid bricks) and one row of headers (end-laid bricks) that formed subtle bands circling the building.

== Relocation ==
When the Shelburne Museum relocated the Schoolhouse to its present site in 1947, the structure had been in disuse for many years. In preparation for the building’s restoration, the Museum created architectural drawings of the building’s exterior before removing the belfry and dismantling the brickwork piece by piece. The Museum replaced the original tinwork of the belfry’s dome with stronger copper, repaired its acorn finial, replaced missing windows, resurfaced the plastered interior walls, and re-hung the bell. The inclusion of desks, benches, and maps reflects the modest furnishings of a 19th-century rural school.

== One-Room Schoolhouse ==
One-room schools were commonplace throughout rural portions of the United States in the late 19th and early 20th centuries. In most rural (country) and small-town schools, all of the students met in a single room. There, a single teacher taught academic basics to five to eight grade levels of elementary-age boys and girls. For more information see One-room school

== School in the 19th century ==
The early school room was about 20 feet square with a huge fireplace in the front. Later heat was supplied by an iron wood stove. Two privies were out back, one for the boys and one for the girls. Drinking water was ladled out of a wooden pail. The buildings were dark and often dirty, with no insulation to keep out the winter cold. There were no playgrounds and often no shade. There were few textbooks. Children used slates and a Bible as school supplies.

Seats were often arranged with the smallest in the front and the tallest in the back so the teacher could see each head.

Schools were only open a few months a year and consisted of winter and summer sessions (usually December–March and then mid-May to August). The older boys were usually working in the fields during the summer, so they only attended in the winter.

Men predominated as teachers until the early 19th century, but by the mid-19th century most teachers were women. Women could be teachers only if they were unmarried; as soon as they married, another teacher was hired. Women were paid half the salaries as men.

Students ranged in age from 4 or 5 to 21, and sometimes toddlers went to school with older siblings who were caregivers. In 1870 in Vermont, the average cost to educate one student was $13.60 per year.

Grading did not exist. Curriculum consisted of the fundamentals of reading, spelling, writing, and calculating. Students recited the alphabet, the definitions of spelling words, the rules of grammar, arithmetic facts, and long prose passages. Few students went beyond the fundamentals taught in the one-room schoolhouse. Teachers were themselves often 14 or 15 years old with no advanced training.

Correct conduct was considered the most important part of a student’s education. Boys entered the schoolroom, took off their hats, and bowed to the teacher and others. On leaving school, they would bow again. Girls would enter, bow or curtsy, and repeat on leaving.

== See also ==
- Shelburne Museum
- General Samuel Strong House
- One-room school
- Vergennes, Vermont
