= Dutton House (Shelburne, Vermont) =

Exhibition house

Coordinates: 44°22′37.07″N 73°13′49.49″W

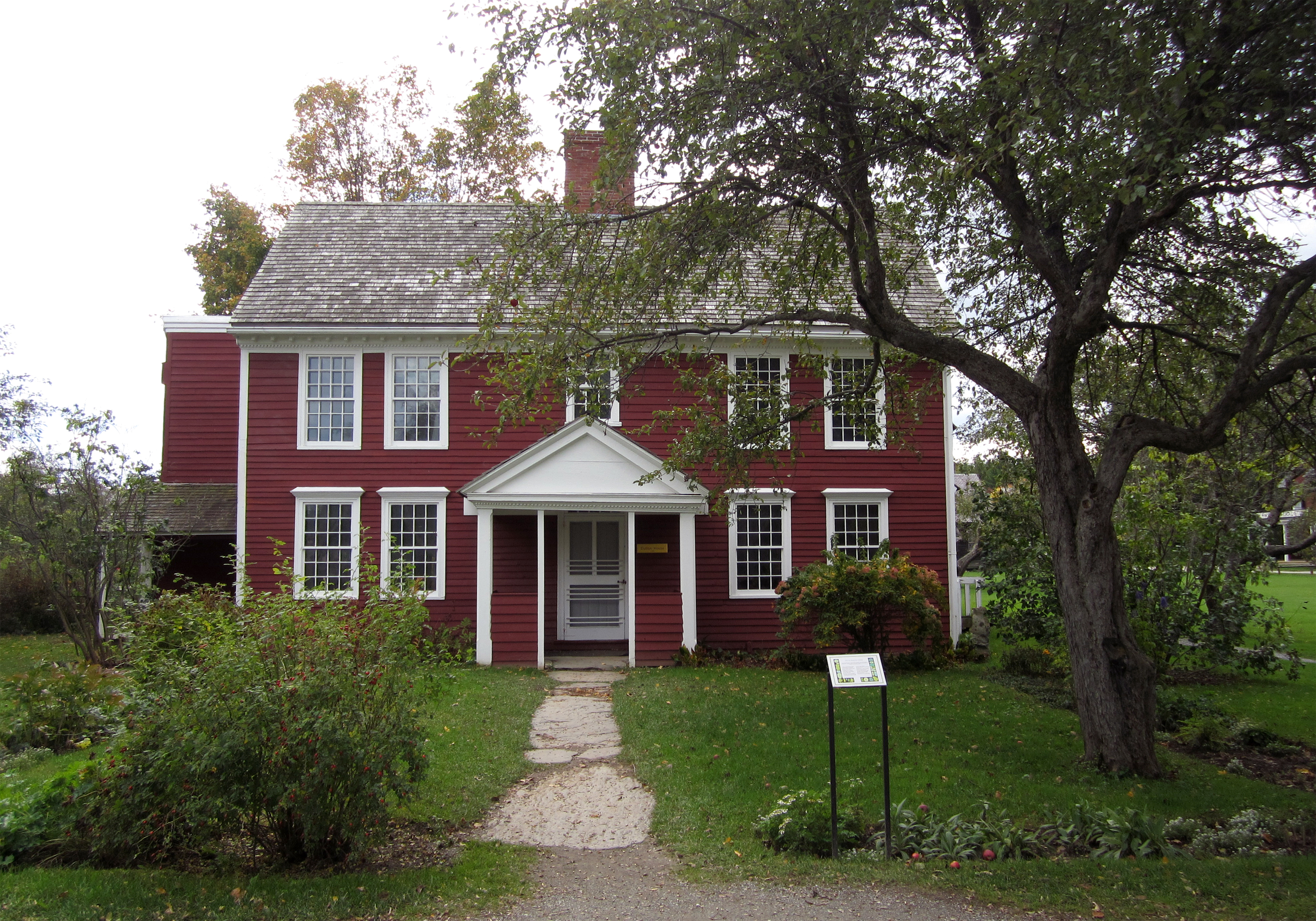
Dutton House, Exterior

The Dutton House is an exhibit building at Shelburne Museum in Shelburne, Vermont; it is also known as the Salmon Dutton House.

Dutton House was the first dwelling brought to the museum property. In order to relocate the structure to the museum grounds, builders dismantled the house. Museum workers photographed the house prior to and while the house was being dismantled. Samples of each stenciled border were excised from the plaster walls. These samples were used as models for recreating the stenciled decoration of Dutton House's interior. The sunburst stencil painted motif over a second-floor fireplace mantle was also retained and installed in the re-erected house. Museum workers added dentil molding, copied from a house in Alburg, Vermont, to the structure's cornice.

== History ==
Salmon Dutton built Dutton House in Cavendish, Vermont, in 1781. Having emigrated from Massachusetts, Dutton worked as a road surveyor, a justice of the peace, and the treasurer of the town of Cavendish. Like many of his contemporaries, Dutton used his house as both a residence and place of business. Continuing his tradition, Dutton's descendants, who occupied the house until 1900, operated Dutton House as a store, an inn, and a boarding house for local mill workers. Although Dutton originally constructed Dutton House in the indigenous saltbox style, he and his descendants expanded the structure as the building's function changed over time. The many additions that extend from the saltbox core reflect the tradition of "continuous" architecture common in New England in the eighteenth and nineteenth centuries.

In the late 1940s Redfield Proctor Jr., Dutton's great-great-grandson, offered the house to the Society for the Preservation of New England Antiquities, now Historic New England. As part of considering the house, architect Frank Chouteau Brown measured and delineated the house and its stencil-painted walls for the Historic American Buildings Survey in 1946. Ultimately, Proctor donated the house to the Vermont Historical Society; however, in 1950 when the Vermont Highway Department's planned road improvements threatened the structure, the society offered it to Shelburne Museum.

== Wall treatments collection ==
Nineteenth-century American homeowners employed many methods in ornamenting their interiors. Rich paint colors and wallpaper were widely available in America as early as 1725, and by 1830 thousands of trade painters offered wallpapering, mural painting, and stenciling among their marketable talents. Shelburne Museum's collection includes examples of all three types of wall treatments.

Members of the upper class often imported French and English wallpaper to adorn formal rooms such as parlors, ballrooms, and dining rooms. These papers frequently represented scenic landscapes and possessed bright colors and bold patterning that could stand out even in weak candlelight.

Mural painting offered an equally decorative but less expensive mode of adornment for those who could not afford to import expensive papers. Jonathan Poor, and his partner, Paine, worked as limners. Traveling around Maine, they offered their services as decorative painters charging $10 for a completed room. Represented in the museum's collection is an ornamental over-mantel and chimney-surround that Poor and Paine created in about 1830. Designed as part of a painted chamber of landscape murals, these paintings, with their views of busy harbors, farms, and forests, are outstanding examples of a decorative technique that is frequently lost to demolition.

In the early nineteenth century, itinerant artists would stencil walls in exchange for room and board. These artists would cut patterns from thin wood or heavy paper and use them to decorate walls and furniture. Stencil House's parlor, dining room, and entrance hall exhibit a variety of stenciled patterns, including a grape leaf border, vases of flowers, and patriotic eagles.

The stencil painting in the Dutton House can be found in the front four rooms and, by and large, is only found along the outer borders of the plaster walls, dating to about 1800. A sunburst is painted over the fireplace mantle in one of the second floor rooms, and is the only plaster replaced in the house after the move from Cavendish. Samples of each of the borders from the four rooms were removed and served as guides when the house was re-erected in Shelburne. Motifs used in the Dutton House borders are found in other houses in Massachusetts, Vermont and New Hampshire. One of the motifs, a freehand decoration used in a first floor room, is also found in the Grimes House in Keene, New Hampshire. The stencil-painted decoration in that house has been attributed to either Jothan Stearns or Jedutham Bullin, thus one of them may have painted the Dutton House interiors.

== See also ==
- Electra Havemeyer Webb
- Redfield Proctor Jr.
- List of the oldest buildings in Vermont
