= Castleton Jail =

Building in Shelburne, Vermont, USA

Coordinates: 44°22′40.88″N 73°13′47.56″W

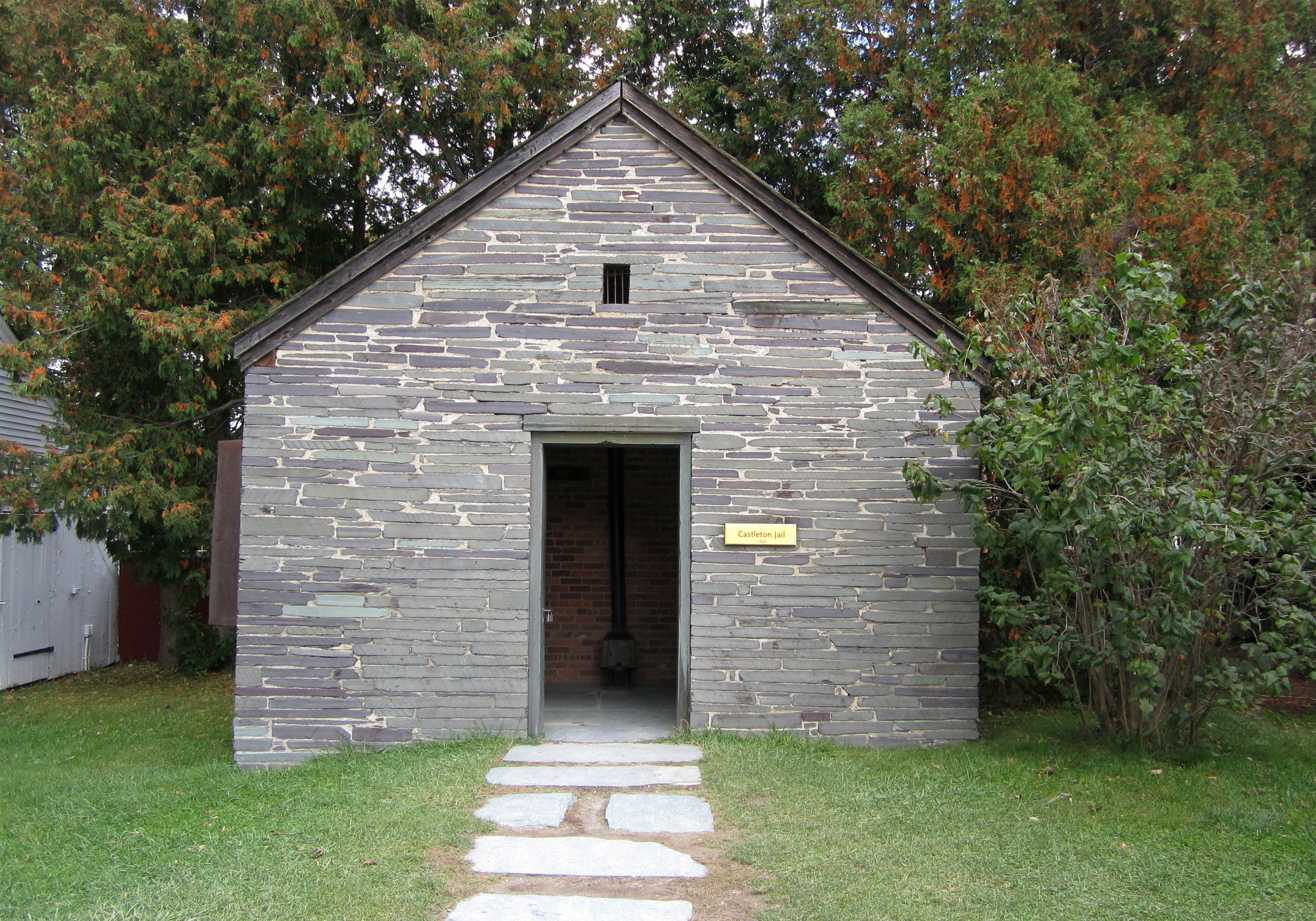
Exterior of the Castleton Jail located at the Shelburne Museum.

The Castleton Jail is an exhibit building located at the Shelburne Museum in Shelburne, Vermont, United States. Constructed entirely of slate, it was originally built in 1890 in Castleton, Vermont, where it operated for over fifty years.

== Castleton ==
Castleton was chartered in 1761. The charter for 36 square miles (93 km^{2}) of land was granted by Gov. Benning Wentworth of New Hampshire and divided the land into 70 "rights" or "shares". Three families had settled in Castleton by 1770. More settlers followed, and by 1777 the town consisted of 17 families. Vermont attained statehood in 1791, and Castleton continued to grow as an agricultural community. Farmers raised cattle, then turned for a while to sheep. Apple orchards abounded. Saw mills and gristmills were the first industries to be established in town. During the middle of the nineteenth century the slate and marble industries began to thrive in and around Castleton. The railroad came in 1854, and the last half of the century saw the development of tourism around Lake Bomoseen.

== Construction ==
The jail building's unusual composition reflects the richness of Vermont's geological deposits. In the early 19th century, Vermonters discovered beds of slate that stretched from the state's western edge to New York's eastern borders. These massive deposits gave birth to a healthy mining industry that still extracts the grey, sea green, and red material.

The nature of slate, with its geologically formed horizontal bedding, causes it to fracture along flat lines and, unlike granite and marble, slate cannot be undercut or sculpted. Consequently, its use as an art material has been minimal. Despite these limitations, the architect of the Castleton Jail took advantage of the planar formation of slate in constructing the jail, layering pieces of slate horizontally to form the exterior walls, and floors. The dark interior consists of two cells and a jailor's compartment with only a single window to admit light and air. A riveted iron door completes this impregnable structure.

== History ==
In 1953, Shelburne Museum purchased the fifty-ton jail from the town of Castleton for one dollar per ton. Only the roof and gable ends were removed for the journey of 64 miles (103 km) to Shelburne. Special dollies with 24 rubber-tired wheels were built to carry the basic structure and demanded additional steering apparatuses and four sets of brakes to maintain control on steep hills. The move, aided by the Vermont State Police, required three days at speeds up to 7 miles per hour (11 km/h). The most difficult obstacle was the Vergennes underpass of the Rutland Railroad, where the clearance was only 5 inches (130 mm).
