= Ben Lane Print Shop =

Coordinates: 44°22′41.61″N 73°13′50.43″W

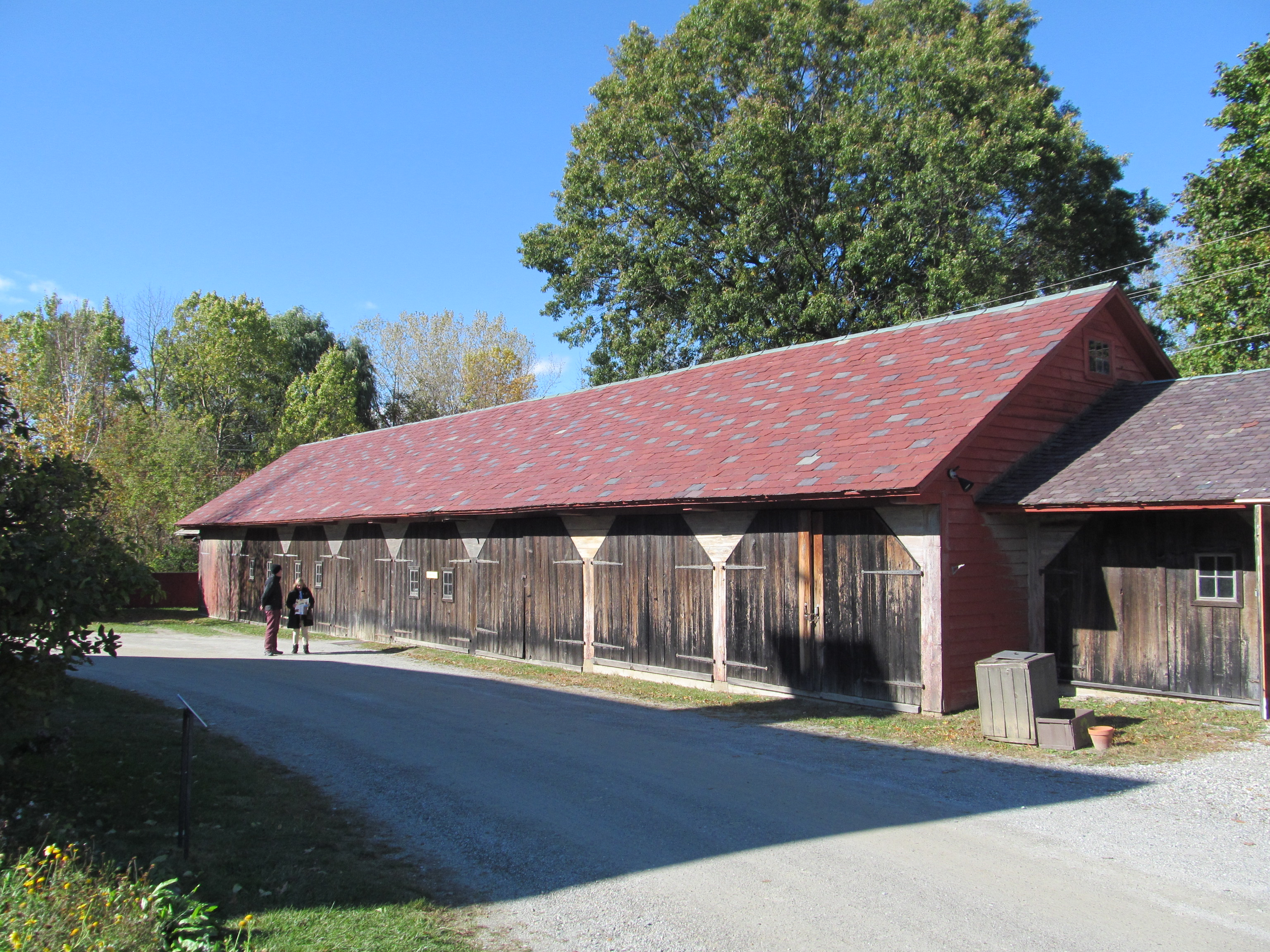
Print Shop

The Ben Lane Print Shop is a demonstration site at Shelburne Museum in Shelburne, Vermont, in the United States.

== History ==
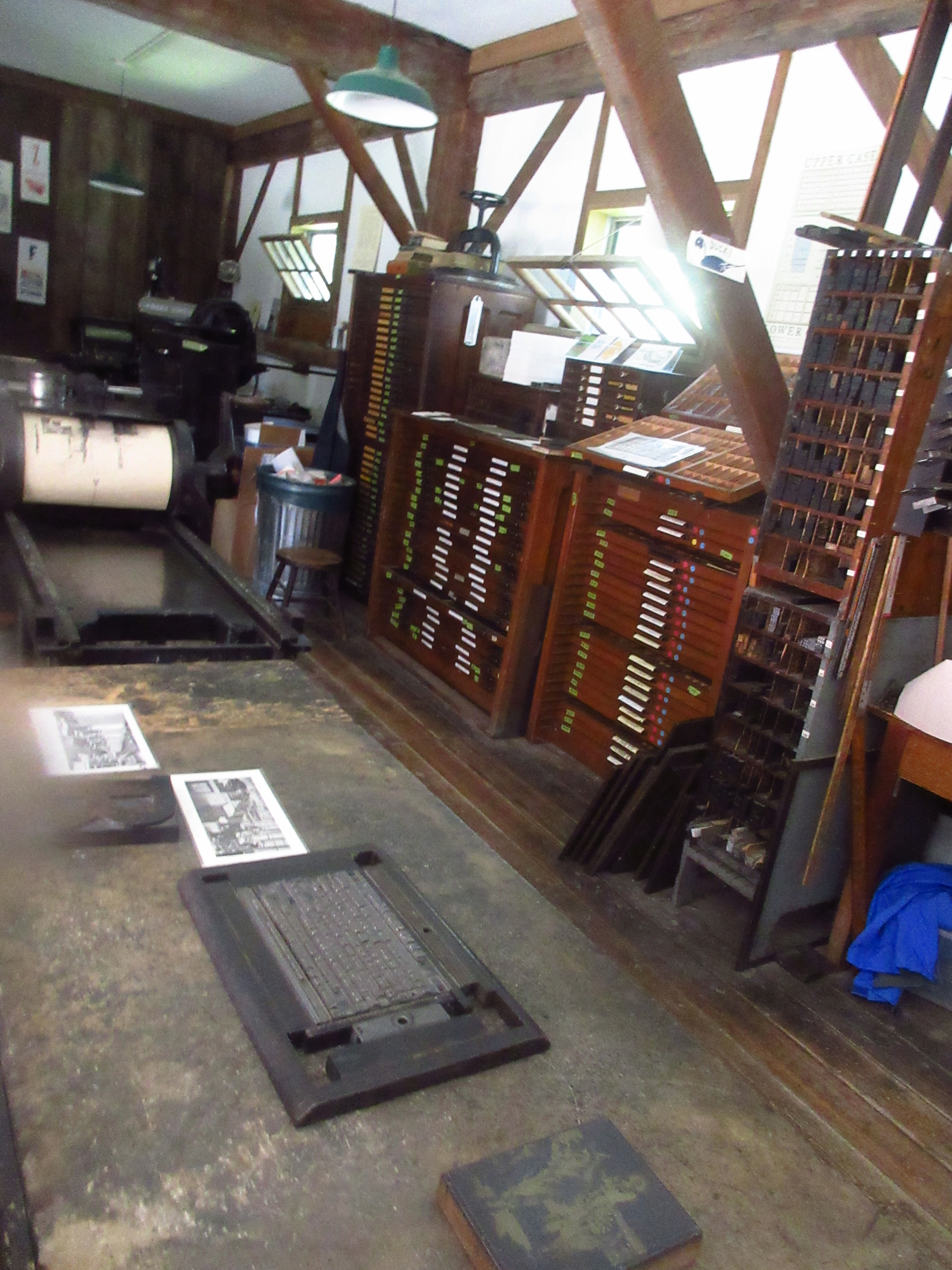
Equipment inside the building.

In 1955 the museum constructed the Ben Lane Printing Shop as a working exhibit. A variety of presses and other equipment demonstrate daily the printing process. The shop also hosts educational programs for children and adults, while manufacturing items for the museum.

Today the building accommodates a typical, small-town printing shop from the first half of the 20th century. Although larger printing businesses of the period adopted the modern process of offset lithography, the new technology arrived slowly to rural areas. Consequently, a press such as the Ben Lane Printing Shop continued to use moveable-type letterpress production similar to that devised by Johannes Gutenberg in the mid-15th century.

The Ben Lane Printing Shop houses the type of equipment that a proprietor and his successors would accumulate in adapting their press to a half-century's technological advancements. In the first decades of the 20th century, print shops continued to use old-fashioned presses for specific purposes. In the case of the Ben Lane Printing Shop, even an 1820s vintage hand press remained in occasional service. Likewise, the Cotrell newspaper press, manufactured in 1871, rolled on a regular basis, as did a treadle-operated Dorman job press of the same vintage for smaller work. Although printers still utilized racks of wood and metal type, a complicated and often cantankerous Linotype machine fulfilled many of the shop's composition requirements. The final addition of a high-speed Heidelberg press with automatic inking and paper feed operated quickly and efficiently and dramatically increased output.

== The name ==
The museum named its printing shop in honor of Benjamin Battles Lane (1897–1987), whose father, Frank, founded the Lane Press of Burlington, Vermont, in 1904. Ben Lane served as president and general manager of Lane Press from 1928 to 1961. His support enabled the museum to install this exhibit and open it to the general public as a living tribute to a centuries-old craft.

== Printing ==
Prints, which are created by using a press and metal plate system, made possible the production of multiple copies of the same image. In late 18th century America, the local silversmith with a talent for engraving on metal often worked with the town printer to produce printed pictures for the general public. Letterpresses and printing procedures are demonstrated in the museum's Print Shop.

== See also ==
- Printing press

== Bibliography ==
- Shelburne Museum. 1993. Shelburne Museum: A Guide to the Collections. Shelburne: Shelburne Museum, Inc.
- Shelburne Museum Print Shop
