= Shelburne Museum Round Barn =

Coordinates: 44°22′23.78″N 73°13′56.08″W

The Round Barn at Shelburne Museum

The Round Barn serves as a gallery space for special exhibitions at Shelburne Museum in Shelburne, Vermont.

== History ==
Fred "Silo" Quimbly constructed the Round Barn, a three-story building measuring 80 feet (24 m) in diameter, in 1901 in Passumpsic, Vermont. Round barns enjoyed a brief period of popularity in the late nineteenth and early twentieth centuries. The Shakers designed and built the first round barn in America in 1826 in Hancock, Massachusetts. The publication of the building's plans in a nationally distributed farm journal in 1896 sparked the construction of approximately 24 comparable barns in Vermont beginning in 1899.

Economy of labor was the fundamental aim of a round barn's design. Feed chutes connecting the upper and middle levels allowed for easy distribution of hay, stored in the spacious loft, and silage, stored in the central silo. Farmers could stanchion up to sixty cows around the center silo for feeding and milking and easily remove manure through trap doors that opened to the basement below, where it could be collected and removed by horse-drawn wagons.

In 1985 and 1986 the Shelburne Museum relocated the Round Barn to the museum grounds. A helicopter flew the upper segment of the silo, which weighs nine thousand pounds, from Passumpsic to Shelburne, while workmen dismantled the remainder of the building piece-by-piece and transported it on flatbed trucks to museum grounds. After reconstruction, new materials replaced what had aged beyond use.

While the roof of the barn was being replaced in April 2009, workers noted the signature of a painter, John Morency, on the silo.

== Bibliography ==
- Wilson, Robert and Victoria Blewer. Vermont Curiosities: Quirky Characters, Roadside Oddities & Other Offbeat Stuff. Globe Pequot Press. 2008, ISBN 978-0762746699
- Hill, Ralph Nading, and Lilian Baker Carlisle. The Story of the Shelburne Museum. 1955, ASIN B0007F20PQ
- Shelburne Museum. 1993. Shelburne Museum: A Guide to the Collections Shelburne Museum, Inc., Example Product Manufacturer, ISBN 978-0939384198
