= The Blacksmith Shop =

Coordinates: 44°22′36.8″N 73°13′54.82″W

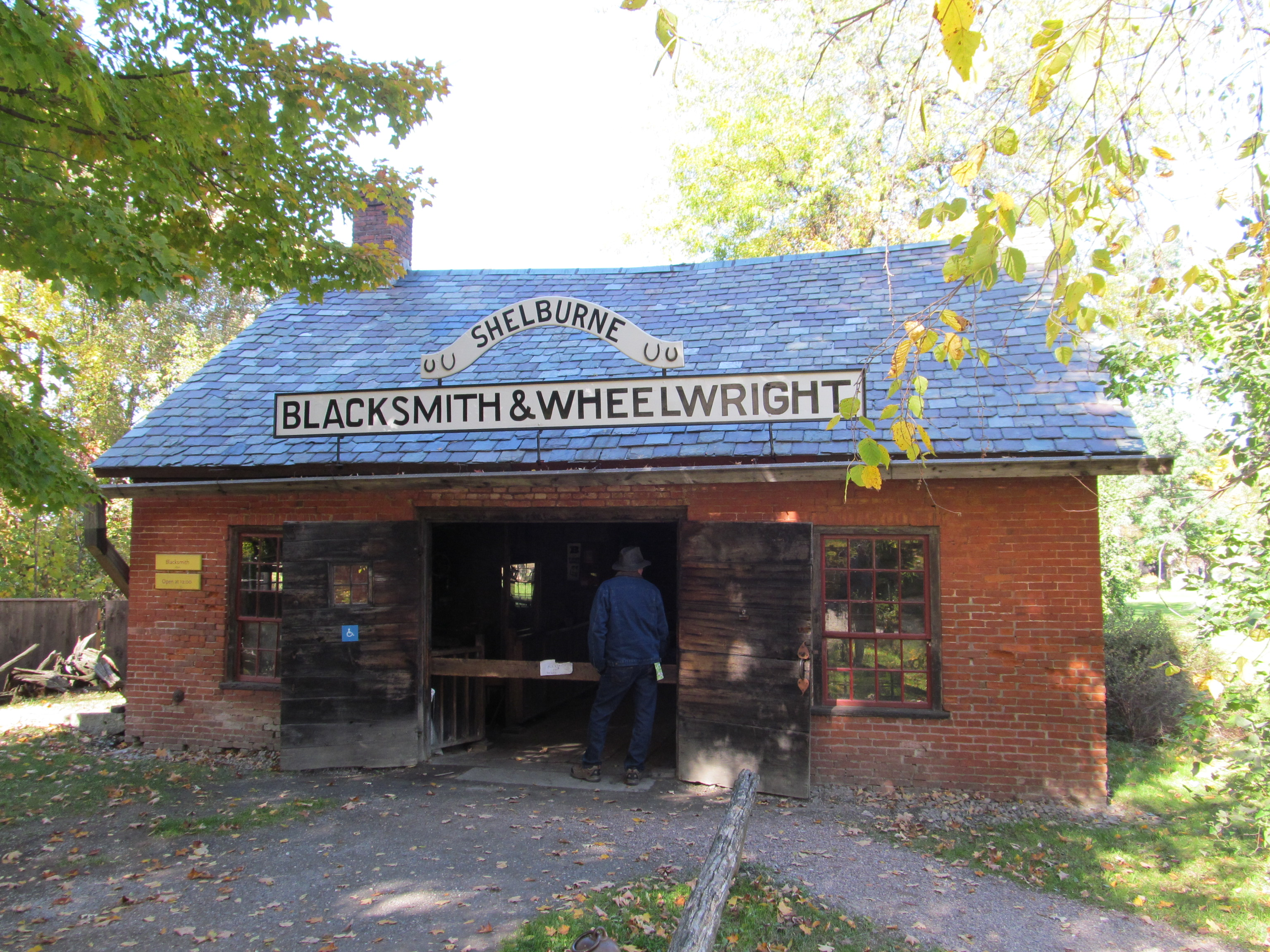
The Blacksmith Shop

The Blacksmith Shop is an exhibit building and a live-demonstration site at Shelburne Museum in Shelburne, Vermont. The Blacksmith Shop, a one-room brick structure built about 1800, and its later frame addition, originally stood near the railroad tracks in the village of Shelburne.

== History ==
While little is known of its early occupancy, records show that John Dubuc had established a blacksmith shop there by 1869. Following Dubuc, a succession of craftspeople occupied the building until it was abandoned in 1935.

Shelburne Museum acquired the Blacksmith Shop in 1955 and moved it to its present location on the museum grounds. In preparation for the move, the building was fitted with a footing of reinforced concrete, braced internally, and jacked up before being rolled onto the bed of a 24-ton trailer, which transported it 2,400 feet (730 m) down Route 7. The Blacksmith Shop opened in 1956 as the museum's first working exhibit, having been re-outfitted with blacksmith and wheelwright tools acquired from a variety of local sources.

== Background information ==
Communities of the 18th and 19th centuries depended heavily on village blacksmiths as their primary source for tools, utensils, agricultural implements, architectural hardware, vehicle parts, and many other items. Many blacksmiths also served as farriers, not only manufacturing shoes for horses and oxen, but outfitting the animals as well.

In larger communities blacksmiths often worked in conjunction with wheelwrights to manufacture and repair vehicle wheels. Although combination blacksmith-wheelwright shops persisted into the 20th century, their focus gradually changed from the manufacture of one-of-a-kind items to the repair of factory-produced goods. Eventually the availability of mass-produced parts as well as the advent of the automobile age rendered both blacksmiths and wheelwrights obsolete.

Shelburne Museum's Blacksmith Shop represents the trade as it was practiced at the turn of the 20th century. Both the efficient, electric blower, which replaced the wood and leather bellows still resting by the forge, and the electric trip hammer enabled smiths, who at that time often found themselves working alone as the apprentice system broke down, to handle larger work without assistance.
