= Museum Covered Bridge =

Historic bridge in Vermont

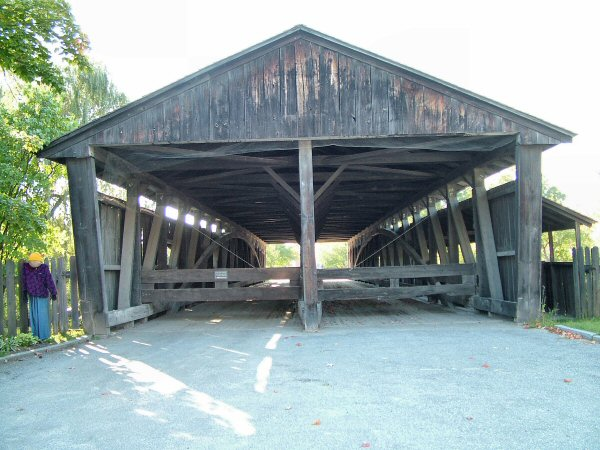
- Coordinates: 44°22′37.17″N 73°13′47.35″W
- Carries: Pedestrian
- Crosses: Man-made pond
- Locale: Shelburne, Vermont
- Maintained by: The Shelburne Museum
- ID number: VT-04-06

Characteristics
- Design: Covered, Burr arch
- Material: Wood
- Total length: 168 ft (51 m)
- No. of spans: 1

History
- Constructed by: George W. Holmes
- Construction end: 1845

Built in 1845, the Museum Covered Bridge originally spanned the Lamoille River in Cambridge, Vermont. The trusses for the double bridge were assembled in a field next to the chosen site. Measuring 168 feet (51 m) in length, with two vehicle lanes and a footpath (attached after its original construction), it is an impressive example of the engineering principles and bridge-builder's craft practiced during the 19th century. The bridge was lighted by kerosene lamps.

During the 1927 Flood the water rose 7 feet (2.1 m) above the floor of the bridge.

The bridge replaced a ferry that existed in its place before, connecting two neighborhoods of Cambridge.

In the late 1940s, Electra Havemeyer Webb of the Shelburne Museum sought to preserve early American life and asked the Vermont Highway Department to help find a bridge worth preserving. When it was learned that the "Big Bridge" (as it was known at the time) was to be replaced, this "double-barreled" bridge with its walkway was too much to resist.

The museum dismantled the Covered Bridge in 1949 and moved it to the museum grounds. The beams still bear the identifying numbers for reconstruction. By situating it above a man-made pond, extensive landscaping integrated the bridge into the grounds. The Covered Bridge served for many years as the museum's entrance, but when automobile traffic proved too taxing, the museum relocated the entrance and retired the bridge from duty.

The current bridge in its original place is the "Wrong Way Bridge" on State Route 15.

== Background ==
While many associate covered bridges with New England, the first covered bridges in the United States were built in Pennsylvania. Artist and inventor Charles Willson Peale received the first patent for a covered bridge in 1797. While his project never came to fruition, seven years later the Town Board of Philadelphia voted to erect what would become the first covered bridge across the Schuylkill River; it was only enclosed by chance after a shareholder of the building company suggested covering it. Roofing a bridge protected the structure from severe weather while adding structural stability, and, as a further benefit, shielded farm animals from frightening views.

In 1804, Connecticut inventor Theodore Burr engineered his design for an arch truss bridge, also called a king-post arch design, and patented it in 1817. Shelburne Museum's Covered Bridge is an example of Burr's creative engineering. Because inventors receive royalties from bridge patents based on a bridge's length, there was a great incentive to devise ways of increasing a bridge's possible span, and the frequently used king-post design could only extend so far. Burr's design, which bolted a single arched timber to the king-post braces, added such stability that not only did the king-post trusses become secondary supports but also the bridge's possible reach greatly increased.

== See also ==
- List of covered bridges in Vermont
