= Apothecary Shop =

Building in Shelburne, Vermont

Coordinates: 44°22′35.94″N 73°13′52.62″W

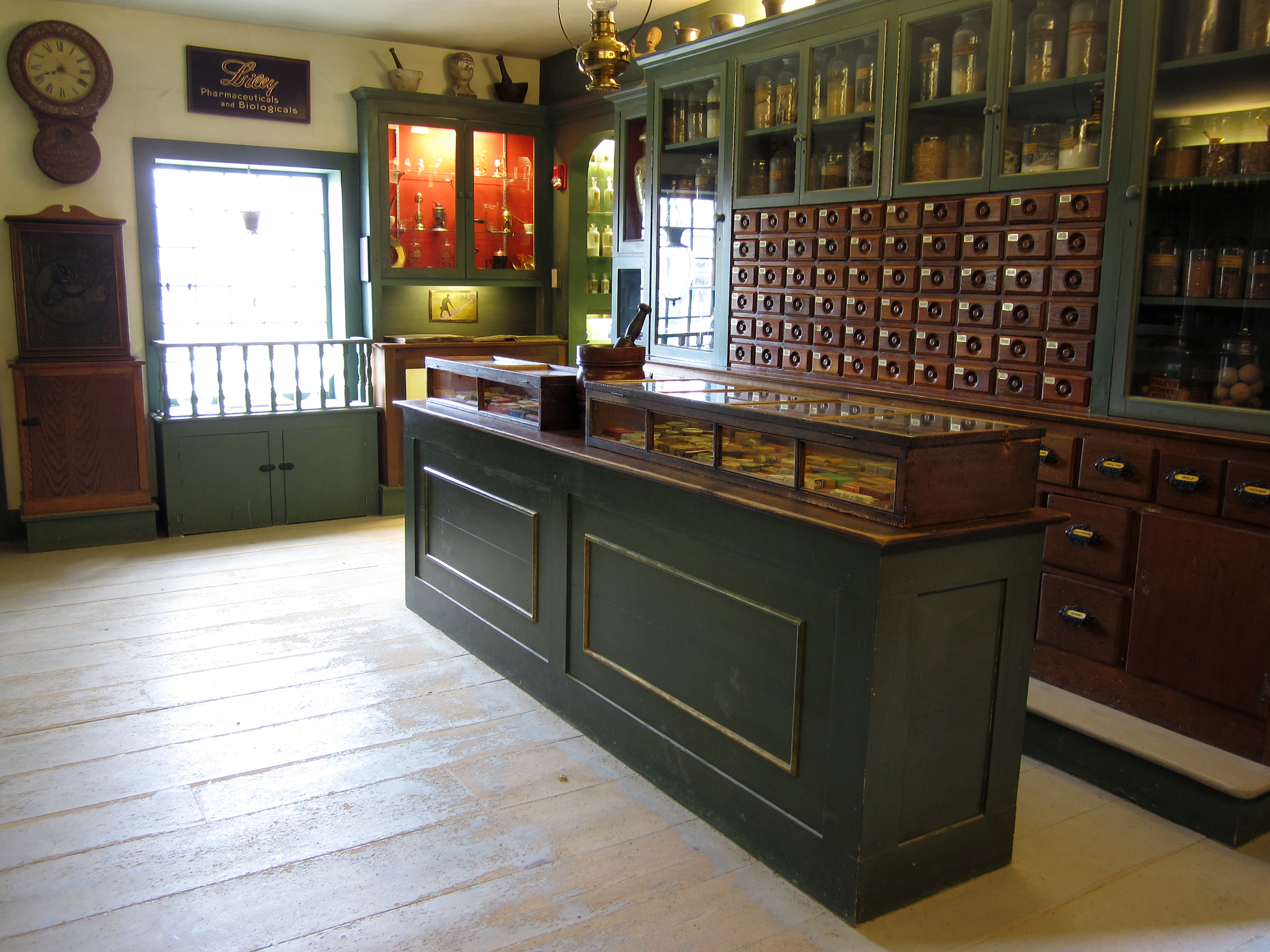
Interior of the Apothecary Shop, located adjacent to the General Store at the Shelburne Museum.

The Apothecary Shop is a building at the Shelburne Museum in Shelburne, Vermont, that exhibits objects salvaged from New England pharmacies that were closing in the early decades of the 20th century. The main room contains dried herbs, spices, drugs, and labeled glass apothecary bottles from the nineteenth century, as well as early patent medicines, medical equipment, cosmetics, and a collection of barbers' razors. The compounding room, with its brick hearth, copper distilleries, and percolators, replicates an illustration found in Edward Parrish's 1871 Treatise on Pharmacy.

== History ==
In 1959 the Shelburne Museum constructed the Apothecary Shop as an addition to the General Store. Inside, the display shelves, pill press, and other professional tools create the appearance of an operating druggist's shop between 1870 and 1900. The glass vessels displayed in the front windows are symbols of the apothecary trade: the red fluid represents arterial blood while the blue represents venous blood.

Prior to the Civil War, druggists gathered and dried herbs, primed them for medicinal use through the process of grinding or distillation, then combined the prepared herbs with sugar, lard, alcohol and other substances to create tablets, ointments, and elixirs. While these practices continued into the late nineteenth century, druggists gradually responded to an ever-greater demand for patent medicines as customers began to prefer brightly labeled cure-alls to herbal remedies. Passage of the Pure Food and Drug Act in 1906 marked the beginning of the modern drugstore and the end of the apothecary shop.
