= Circus Building =

Coordinates: 44°22′22.69″N 73°13′58.68″W

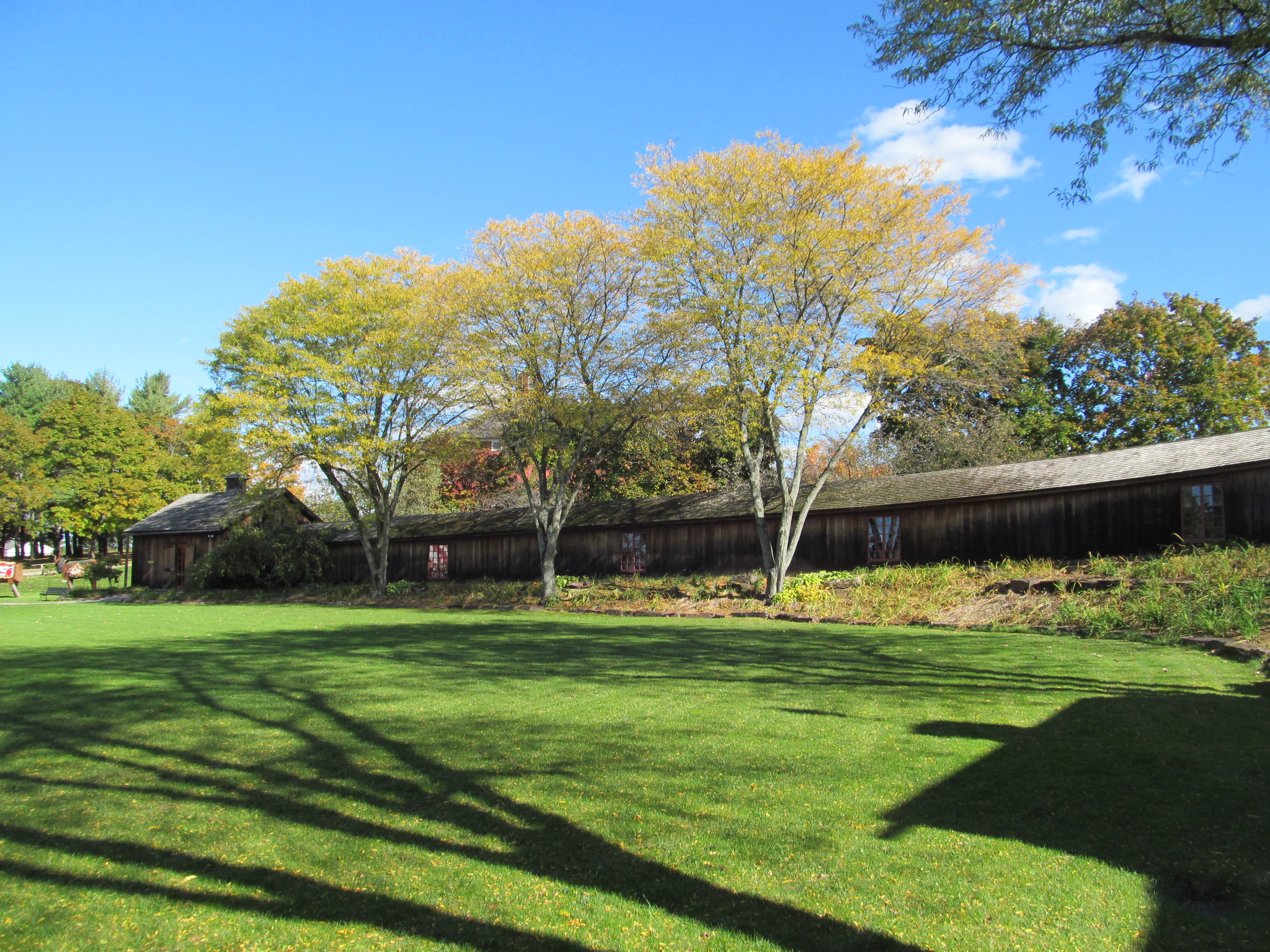
Circus Building

The Circus Building is an exhibit building at Shelburne Museum in Shelburne, Vermont. It houses a collection of circus posters, Gustav A. Dentzel Carousel animals, and elaborately carved miniature circuses, including those by Roy Arnold and Edgar Kirk.

== History ==
In the 1950s the Shelburne Museum conceived of the design for the Circus Building, completed in 1965, to meet the requirements of exhibiting the 500-foot-long (150 m) Roy Arnold miniature circus. Traversing the grand hallway of the large horseshoe-shaped, spruce and cedar structure gives the impression of walking through the entire concourse of a circus parade. Outside, the large boulders that form the building's foundation accentuate the structure's dramatic shape and serve as the backdrop for the Daylily Garden, planted in 2008.

== Collection ==
=== Carousel figures ===
Although the carousel was invented in Europe, it reached its fullest development in the United States between 1870 and 1930. during this time, elaborate carousels became fixtures of the new city parks built for a public with increasing amounts of leisure time and disposable income. Hundreds of park carousels were built by highly skilled woodcarvers and painters, while an even greater number of smaller, portable carousels were made for use at country fairs and carnivals.

Shelburne Museum owns examples of both types of carousels: a small, portable machine operates outside the Circus Building, while the animals, chariots and painted panels from a part carousel manufactured by the Gustav Dentzel Company of Philadelphia are exhibited inside the Circus Building. Figures by a number of other manufacturers, both European and American, also are exhibited in the Circus building.

The German-born Dentzel opened America's first carousel business in 1867. Dentzel's shop produced the most realistic and graceful of all carousel animals; his carvers paid enormous attention to anatomical detail, and his painters rendered every nuance of the animals' coloration. Shelburne Museum's Dentzels are from a forty-animal carousel completed about 1902. The three-row machine carried twenty-nine horses and four chariots; menagerie figures include three giraffes, three goats, three deer, a lion and a tiger. The figures were finish-carved by Daniel Muller, the most skilled of Dentzel's craftspeople. All the animals are in their original factory paint; this is almost unheard of for carousel figures, because most carousels were repainted frequently as part of routine maintenance. Several of the figures have recently been conserved; layers of discolored, non-original linseed oil were removed to reveal the richly colored and complex paint patterns applied by Dentzel's masterful painters. All forty animals will eventually receive the same professional treatment.

The small, portable carousel outside the circus building was made about 1920 by the Allan Herschell Company of North Tonawanda, New York. In 1883 Herschell began producing carousels designed to endure hard wear and frequent travel. The horses were smaller and more compact than those made for permanent park carousels by such companies as Dentzel and the Philadelphia Toboggan Company. Heads and legs were tucked close to the bodies to minimize breakage, and the machines could be easily taken apart, moved, and reassembled.

=== Circus posters ===
In the 19th and early 20th centuries, the circus was an annual event awaited with great anticipation. Weeks before the circus was due to arrive, colorful posters appeared on barns and fences, announcing the dates and new performers. When the circus arrived, excitement grew as wagons, elephants, and clowns paraded through town.

Traveling circuses are represented at the Shelburne Museum by the vintage advertising posters that line the inside wall of the Circus Building. The museum's collection of over five hundred circus posters is among the finest and most comprehensive in the country. It includes many extremely rare, early posters as well as examples from all the major circuses of the Golden Age of the American traveling circus (ca. 1870-1940), including Barnum and Bailey, Ringling Brothers, Adam Forepaugh, John B. Doris, and the Sells Brothers. The posters are typically brightly colored and attention-grabbing. Most feature dramatic new acts or exotic animals; many make outrageous (and sometimes utterly false) claims – the largest, the smallest, the most dangerous, the rarest, the one and only, etc.

=== Circus carvings ===
The museum owns three elaborate carved miniature circuses. The Circus Parade, which runs over 500 feet (150 m) through the circus building, was begun in 1925 by Roy Arnold (1892-1976) of Hardwick, Vermont. Built on a one-inch to one-foot scale, the parade required thirty years to complete. Four other skilled woodcarvers, Harry T. Prior, Charles W. Dech, Milo Smith and Charles Lockier, worked with Arnold on the parade, which features accurate reproductions of wagons used by circuses of the Golden Age. The miniature parade is complemented by exhibits of pony-sized wagons and several life-sized figures originally carved by Samuel Anderson Robb for Barnum and Bailey tableau wagons in the 1890s. Robb is best known for his trade figures, several of which are exhibited in Stagecoach Inn.

The Kirk Bros. Miniature Circus is a complete three-ringed folk art circus created by Edgar Decker Kirk (1891-1956) of Harrisburg, Pennsylvania, over a period of 46 years. Kirk, who worked as a brakeman on the Pennsylvania Railroad, began the circus in 1910 when his children were small and continued to work on it long after they were grown, until 1956. Working at night after twelve-hour days with the railroad, Kirk cut the figures for his circus from scrap lumber on a treadle-operated jigsaw and completed the carving with an ordinary penknife. Only the nails and paint were specially purchased. The Kirk circus, complete with animal acts, clowns, trapeze artists, bands, side shows and bleachers full of spectators and vendors, is a monument to Kirk's creativity, ingenuity and lifelong passion for the circus.

Also in the collection are scale models of a canal boat circus. From 1882 to 1887 residents of ports along the Erie and Oswego canals of central New York state were visited each summer by Sig Sautelle's big shows, one of the only circuses ever to travel by boat. Sautelle, born George Satterlee (1848–1928), was a colorful showman and one of the most successful promoters of his time. The wooden models of Sautelle's two circus canal boats, built by Milo Smith of Herkimer, New York, provide a vivid picture of this unique regional circus.
