= Settlers House =

Coordinates: 44°22′34.69″N 73°13′46.89″W

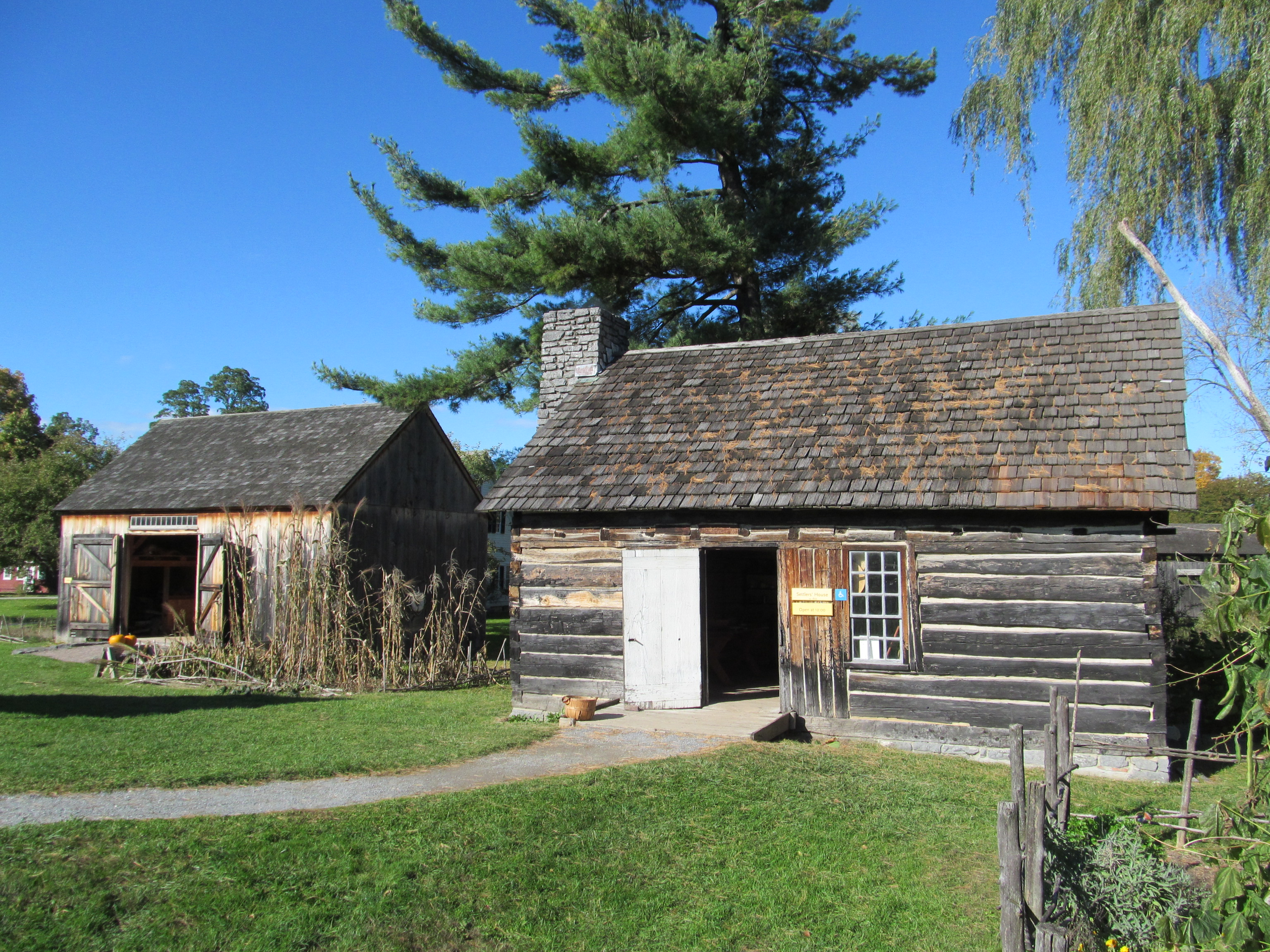
Settlers House and Barn

The Settlers' House was built in 1845 in East Charlotte, Vermont. The house is set up at the Shelburne Museum in Shelburne, Vermont, to show visitors life in the 18th century. The barn situated next to the house was built as a working demonstration in 2001.

== History ==
French Canadian lumberjacks probably built the Settlers' Cabin in East Charlotte in about 1800. Constructed of hand-hewn and dovetailed beech and pine timbers, Settlers' Cabin is typical of the type of structure that Vermont settlers, loggers, and trappers often built as temporary homes.

When the Shelburne Museum acquired the structure in 1955, clapboard facing obscured the log structure beneath. After moving the building's exterior walls to the grounds intact, the museum provided a new foundation, replaced the roof, and restored the cabin's single interior room, stone fireplace, and sleeping loft. The structure, in combination with the adjacent hay barn, which the museum constructed in 2001, now houses the museum's only living exhibition that reveals how early Vermont settlers lived.

In 1959 the museum constructed the sawmill adjacent to the Settlers' Cabin. In colonial America wood was needed to construct everything from sailing ships to storage kegs, and lumber, forested by loggers like the French Canadians who built the Settlers' Cabin, quickly emerged as the most important cash crop of 18th-century America. The museum's sawmill illustrates how this cash crop was prepared for market.

Swiftly moving water can create energy powerful enough to run machinery. While in operation, the water's motion forced the sawmill's saw blade up and down, enabling it to cut through logs directed into its path. At full speed, the saw cut two strokes per second, which allowed a sawyer to cut a 10-foot (3.0 m) board in eight minutes.

Historically the term "sawmill" referred both to the mill building and to the machinery it contained. Shelburne's Sawmill was built to house equipment from a South Royalton, Vermont, sawmill that was operated by Jeremiah Trescott and his partner Captain Stevens from the late 18th century. The Shepard family, descendants of Trescott, continued to operate the mill until the early 20th century and later donated its contents to the museum.
