= Jim Crow Museum of Racist Memorabilia =

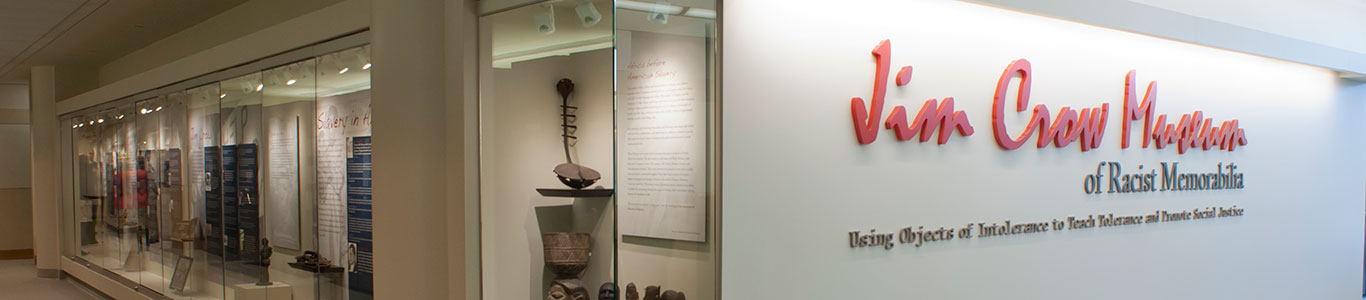

- Location within Michigan
- Established: 1996
- Location: Big Rapids, Michigan
- Coordinates: 43.68748°N 85.48243°W
- Type: History museum
- Collection size: 10,000
- Curator: David Pilgrim
- Owner: Ferris State University
- Website: www.ferris.edu/jimcrow/

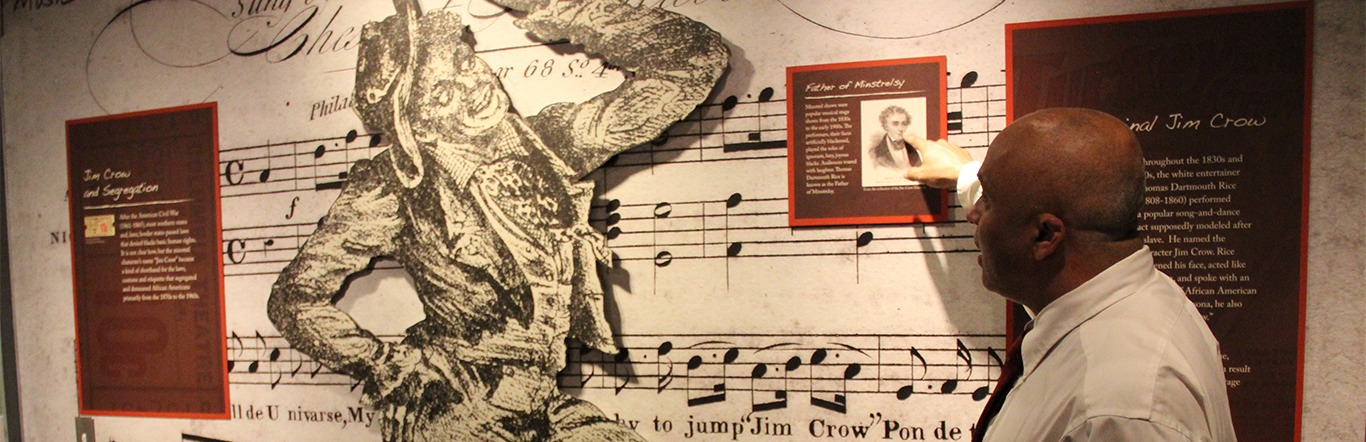
Who and What was Jim Crow

The Jim Crow Museum of Racist Memorabilia at Ferris State University, Big Rapids, Michigan, displays a wide variety of artifacts depicting the history of racist portrayals of African Americans in American popular culture. The mission of the Jim Crow Museum is to use objects of intolerance to teach tolerance and promote social justice.

As of 2024, the Jim Crow Museum of Racist Memorabilia had a collection of over 30,000 objects, primarily created between the 1870s and the 1960s. It also includes contemporary objects. The museum is named after Jim Crow, a song-and-dance caricature of black people that by 1838 had become a pejorative expression meaning "Negro". When at the end of the 19th century American legislatures passed laws of racial segregation directed against blacks, these statutes became known as the Jim Crow laws.

The museum demonstrates how racist ideas and anti-black images were pervasive within American culture. It also displays artifacts related to contemporary forms of racism, stories about African American achievements, and the Civil Rights Movement.

== History ==
David Pilgrim, PhD, a former professor of sociology, and now Vice President for Diversity and Inclusion at Ferris State University, started to collect racist memorabilia in flea markets across America in the 1970s. By 1996, the collection had grown to over 2,000 pieces, and Pilgrim decided to donate the collection to Ferris State because "it needed a real home." The collection was housed for 15 years in a small space, utilized as a teaching tool for university classes. In 2012 the Jim Crow Museum was opened to the public as a larger, brand new facility, located in the lower level of Ferris State University's FLITE Building.

By 2024, the museum's collection had outgrown that space, and in December of that year, ground was broken on a 26,000-square-foot building for the museum on the Ferris State campus. The new space was designed to encourage deeper understanding of the realities of race in American history and to educate through stories and engagement as well as through objects. The existing museum closed to the public in November 2025 so that collections could be protected and prepared for the new museum, and reopened in October 2026.

== Collection ==
The largest portion of the museum's holdings is anti-black memorabilia, for example, mammy candles, Nellie fishing lures, picaninny ashtrays, sambo masks, and lawn jockeys. The museum also displays Jim Crow memorabilia—books, signs, tickets, brochures, and photographs—that promoted racial segregation. Many of the objects are disturbing because of historical cruelty or denigrating topics they refer to. Other objects related to resistance to injustice and to recognition of black leaders can be uplifting and transformative. Publicity for the museum notes that many objects "contain explicit images of violence, nudity, offensive language, and other mature themes" and that visits by children under age 12 years are not recommended.

== Mission ==
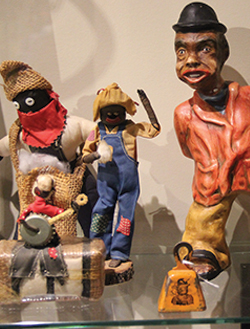
Caricatures of stereotypes of African Americans

The Jim Crow Museum at Ferris State University strives to become a leader in social activism and in the discussion of race and race relations. "Many of today’s students have only a vague understanding of the dreadful impact of Jim Crow laws and customs." "More specifically, they lack a fundamental knowledge of restrictive covenants, literacy tests, poll taxes, and other oppressive features of the Jim Crow racial hierarchy". The Jim Crow Museum offers students an opportunity to learn about this period in the history of the United States.

Most of the objects displayed in the museum were created with the intent of belittling and humiliating African Americans. Nevertheless, the museum's staff believes that these objects can be used to fuel intelligent discussions about race, race relations, and racism.

Woodbridge N. Ferris, the founder of Ferris Institute (now Ferris State University), challenged faculty, staff, and students to "make the world a better place". The Jim Crow Museum is one attempt by the university to improve the world. This is seen in the museum's mission to "use objects of intolerance to teach tolerance and promote social justice".

== Exhibitions ==
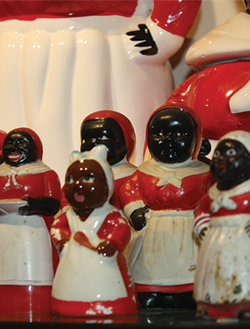
Mammy figurines in the Jim Crow Museum

The Jim Crow Museum is open and is free to the public. The Museum features six exhibit areas:

1. Who and What was Jim Crow
2. Jim Crow Violence
3. Jim Crow and Anti-Black Imagery
4. Achieving Despite Resistance
5. The Battle Continues (contemporary forms of racism)
6. A New Wave of Egalitarianism (positive representations of African Americans)

The Museum also offers a comprehensive timeline of the African American experience in the United States. The timeline is divided into six sections: Africa Before Slavery, Slavery in America, Reconstruction, Jim Crow, Civil Rights and Post Civil Rights.

== Publications ==
David Pilgrim, the founder and curator of the Jim Crow Museum, has published two books related to the museum's collection and mission. Understanding Jim Crow introduces readers to the Jim Crow Museum and how the museum uses racist memorabilia to teach tolerance and promote social justice. Watermelons, Nooses, and Straight Razors is a compilation of stories from the Jim Crow Museum.

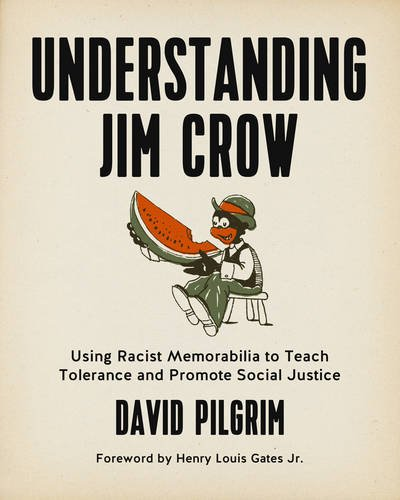

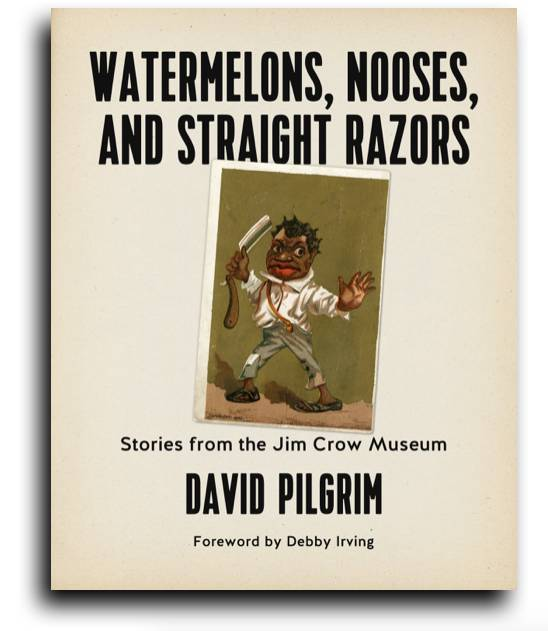

== See also ==
- Jew with a coin
- Racial segregation in the United States
- Social justice
- African-American studies
- Americana
