= Jews, Money, Myth =

Jews, Money, Myth was an exhibition held at the Jewish Museum London in 2019. It was made in collaboration with the Pears Institute for the Study of Antisemitism at Birkbeck, University of London with the academic collaboration from David Feldman, Anthony Bale, and Marc Volovici.

The exhibition traced the ideas that Jewish people are unusually greedy and money-oriented to "the earliest days of Christianity." Curator Joanne Rosenthal explained that the goal was to "debunk a lot of the myths that still circulate today,... such as Jews exerting a kind of sinister influence on world events, Jews financing disastrous wars around the world for profit, Jews being naturally drawn to money making." The idea to create the exhibit came from the museum's director, Abigail Morris.

The exhibition opened at a time when antisemitism was resurgent. According to director Abigail Morris, "Not drawing attention to (antisemitism) won’t make it go away." Reviewing the exhibition in The Spectator, Douglas Murray noted that, "hatred of Jews can come from everything. From their wealth and poverty, for integrating and not integrating," and called this a fact that is, "well demonstrated" by this exhibit.

The most notable painting in the exhibition, Rembrandt's 1629 painting, Judas Returning the Thirty Pieces of Silver, was on loan from a private collector. An image of medieval financier Isaac of Norwich at the top of a 1233 English tax document is said to be the world's oldest antisemitic caricature.

According to Sara Lipton, one of the historians who consulted on the exhibition, the medieval artistic convention of depicting Jews with hooked noses, dark skin, and scraggly or pointy beards originated in the 13th century as commissioned works of art depicting the sinfulness of greed. Howard Jacobson notes that even if the Church's motivation was to discourage sin rather than to promote Jew-hatred, it is "a hard distinction to maintain". The exhibit includes a few examples of Jew with a coin figurines, a modern custom of placing a picture or figurine showing a Jew holding a moneybag or coin at the entrance to a home or business as a magical charm to attract wealth that developed in Poland in the 1990s.

A film by Jeremy Deller was commissioned for the exhibition. Geller compiled recent footage of contemporary media personalities, politicians, and propagandists making antisemitic statements. Diana Muir Appelbaum described the film as "an endless loop of clips of contemporary expressions of anti-Semitism emanating from various points on the political and religious spectrum across Europe and the United States."
