= Abigail Morris =

Abigail Morris may refer to:

- Abigail Morris (arts administrator)
- Abigail Morris (musician)
