= Galicia Jewish Museum =

Museum in Kraków, Poland

The Galicia Jewish Museum
- Żydowskie Muzeum Galicja
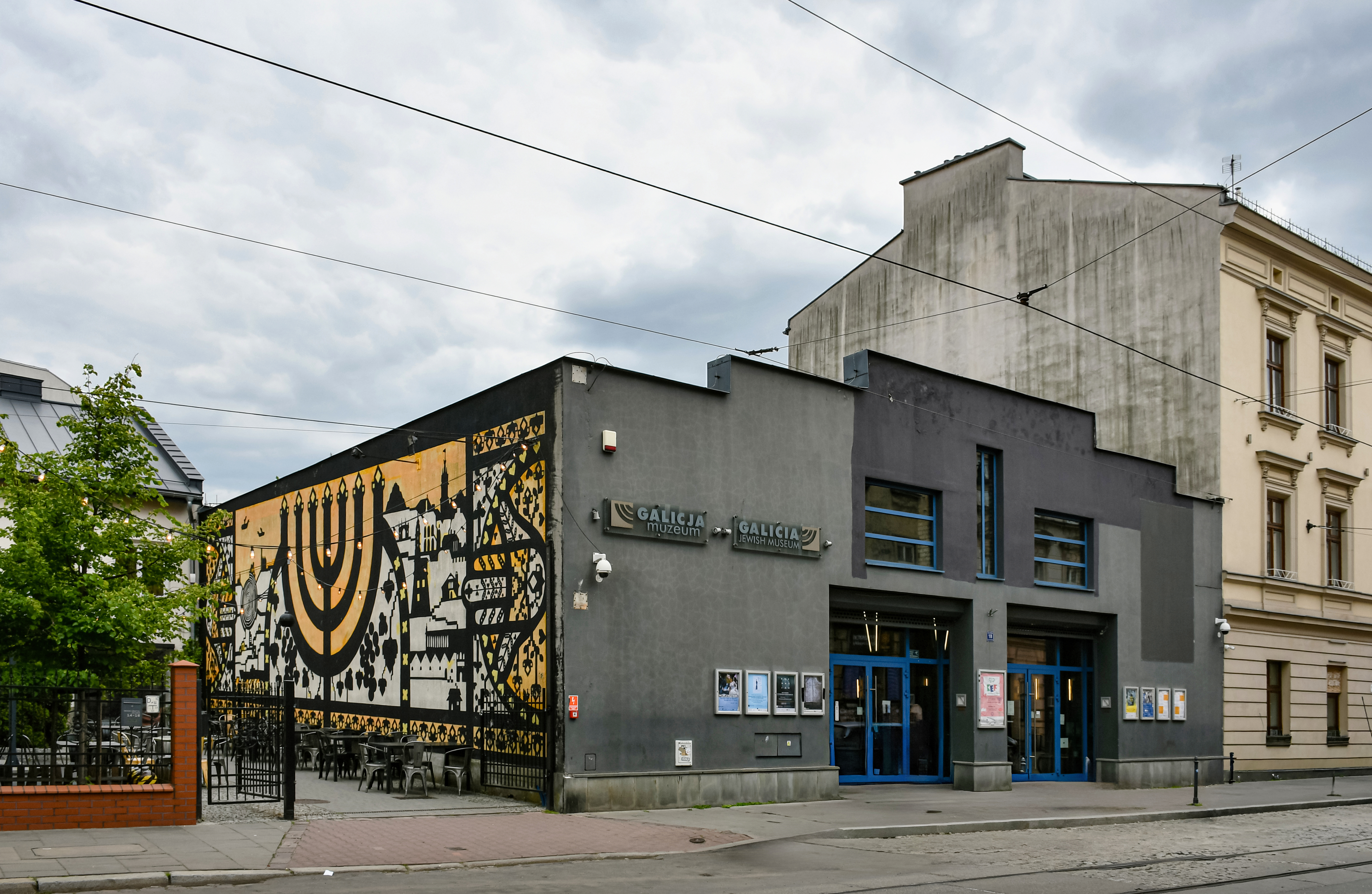
- Galicia Jewish Museum in Kazimierz
- Established: 2004
- Location: 18 Dajwór Street; Kraków; Poland
- Coordinates: 50°3′3.02″N 19°56′58.73″E
- Type: Historical
- Collection size: History of Polish Jews in Galicia
- Visitors: 60,000
- Director: Jakub Nowakowski
- Website: galiciajewishmuseum.org

Historic Monument of Poland
- Designated: 1994-09-08
- Part of: Kraków historical city complex
- Reference no.: M.P. 1994 nr 50 poz. 418

The Galicia Jewish Museum (Polish: Żydowskie Muzeum Galicja) is located at 18 Dajwór Street in Kazimierz the historic Jewish district of Kraków, Poland. It is a photo exhibition documenting the remnants of Jewish culture and life in Polish Galicia, which used to be very vibrant in this area.

== History ==
The museum was established in April 2004 by the British photojournalist Chris Schwarz (whose father originated from Lwów), in cooperation with Professor Jonathan Webber of UNESCO, in an effort to celebrate the Jewish culture of the Polish Galicia and commemorate the victims of the Holocaust in Poland.

Following Schwarz' early death in 2007, Kate Craddy became the director of the museum. She was followed by Jakub Nowakowski in 2010. Both English and Polish have remained the museum's main operating languages. The museum welcomes over 30,000 visitors annually from around the world.

== Exhibitions ==
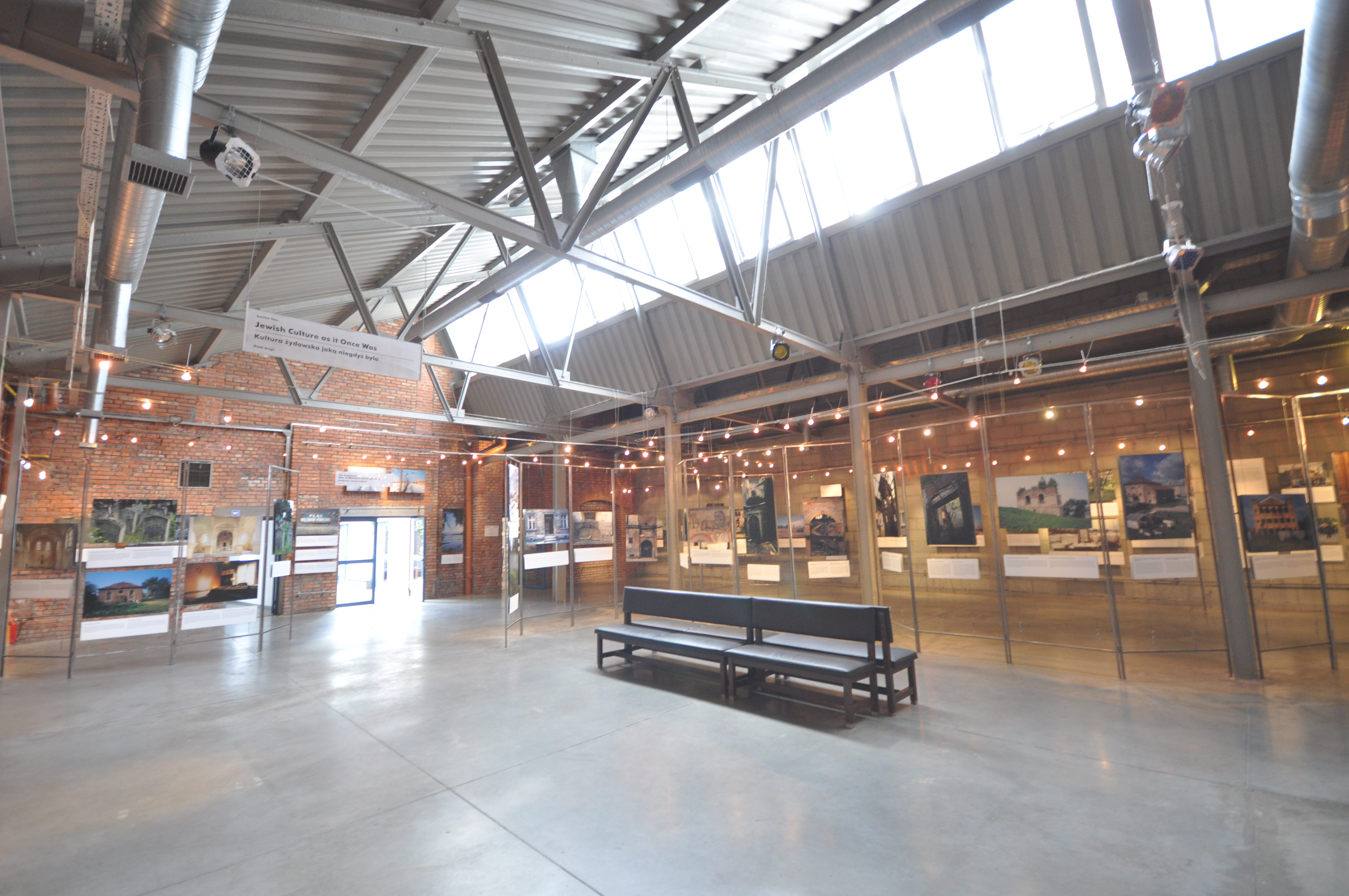
Main exhibition hall

The main exhibition of the museum, Traces of Memory, is the result of a twelve-year collaboration between photographer and museum founder Chris Schwarz and British scholar Jonathan Webber. It commemorates the 800-year Jewish presence in western Galicia (today's southeastern Poland) through contemporary photographs of synagogues, cemeteries and other relics of the Jewish presence in the region still visible today. The exhibition is divided into five sections, representing different ways of approaching the Jewish past in Polish Galicia: Jewish Life in Ruins, Jewish Culture as it Once Was, The Holocaust: Sites of Massacre and Destruction, How the Past is Being Remembered and People Making Memory Today. A part of the exhibition is dedicated to Auschwitz concentration camp.

In 2008, the museum collaborated with the Auschwitz Jewish Center to create the exhibition Polish Heroes, which focuses on the Polish Righteous Among the Nations. Today, the exhibition can be seen in six museums across Poland, England and the United States.

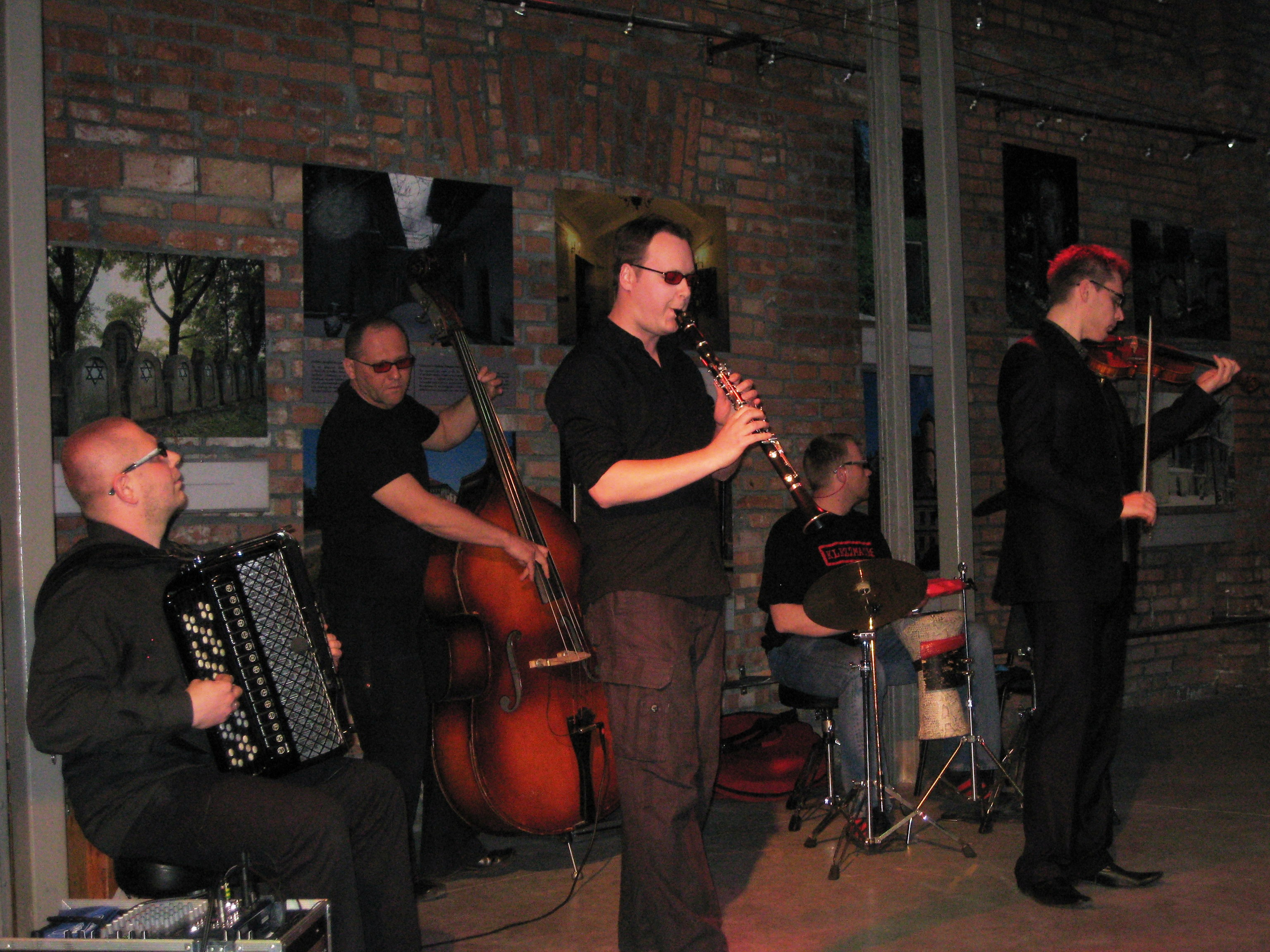
Klezmer concert at the museum (2009)

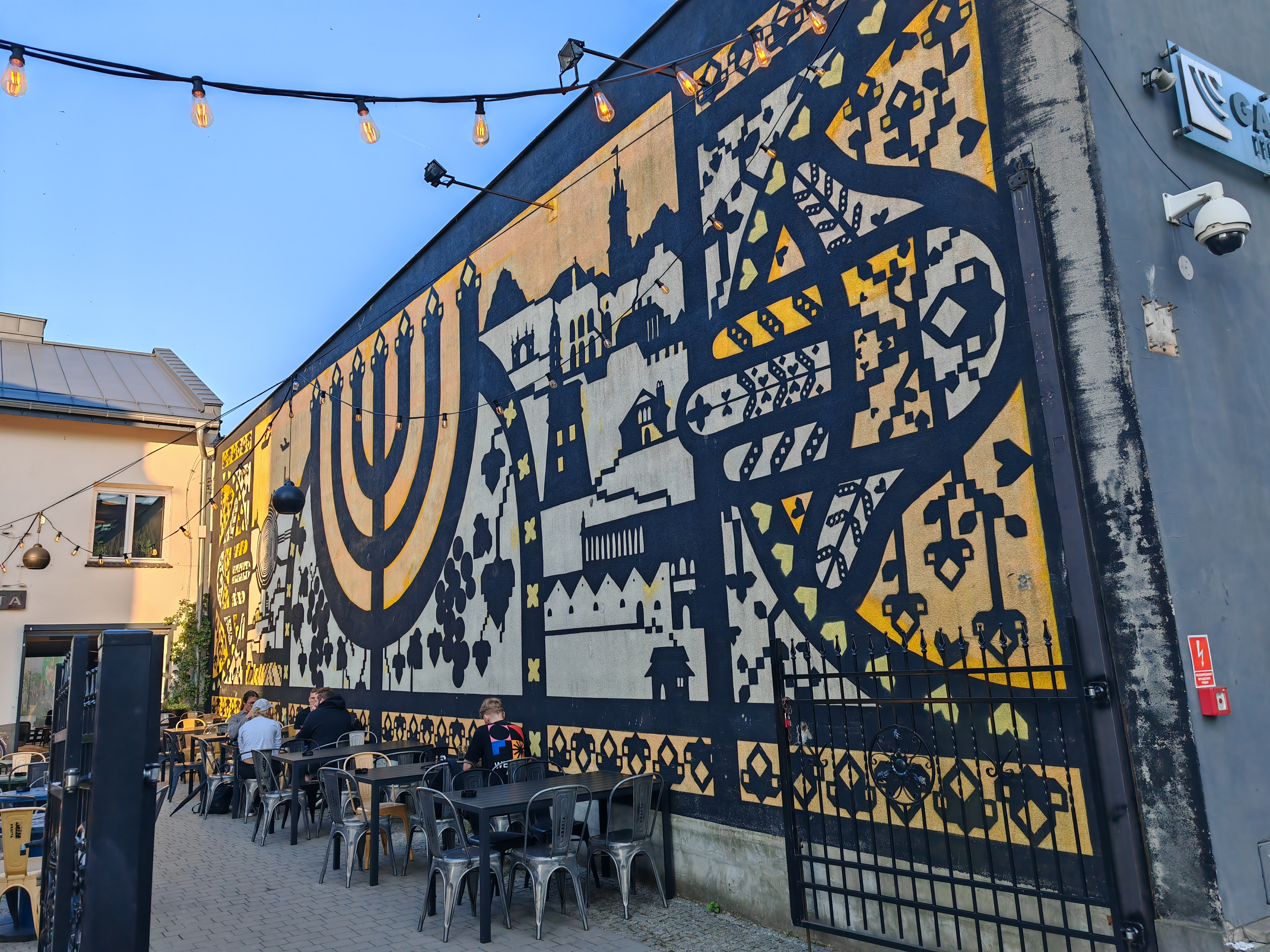
Mural by Marcin Wierzchowski on the Galicia Jewish Museum building

The Galicia Jewish Museum has two permanent exhibition spaces, and hosts two to three temporary exhibitions covering a range of materials that complement the mission of the museum, curated both in-house and sourced externally, and including modern art on Jewish themes. The museum is also the venue of choice for many international travelling exhibitions coming to Central Europe for the first time, and is an experienced tour manager for exhibitions travelling in both Poland and overseas.

=== Past exhibits ===
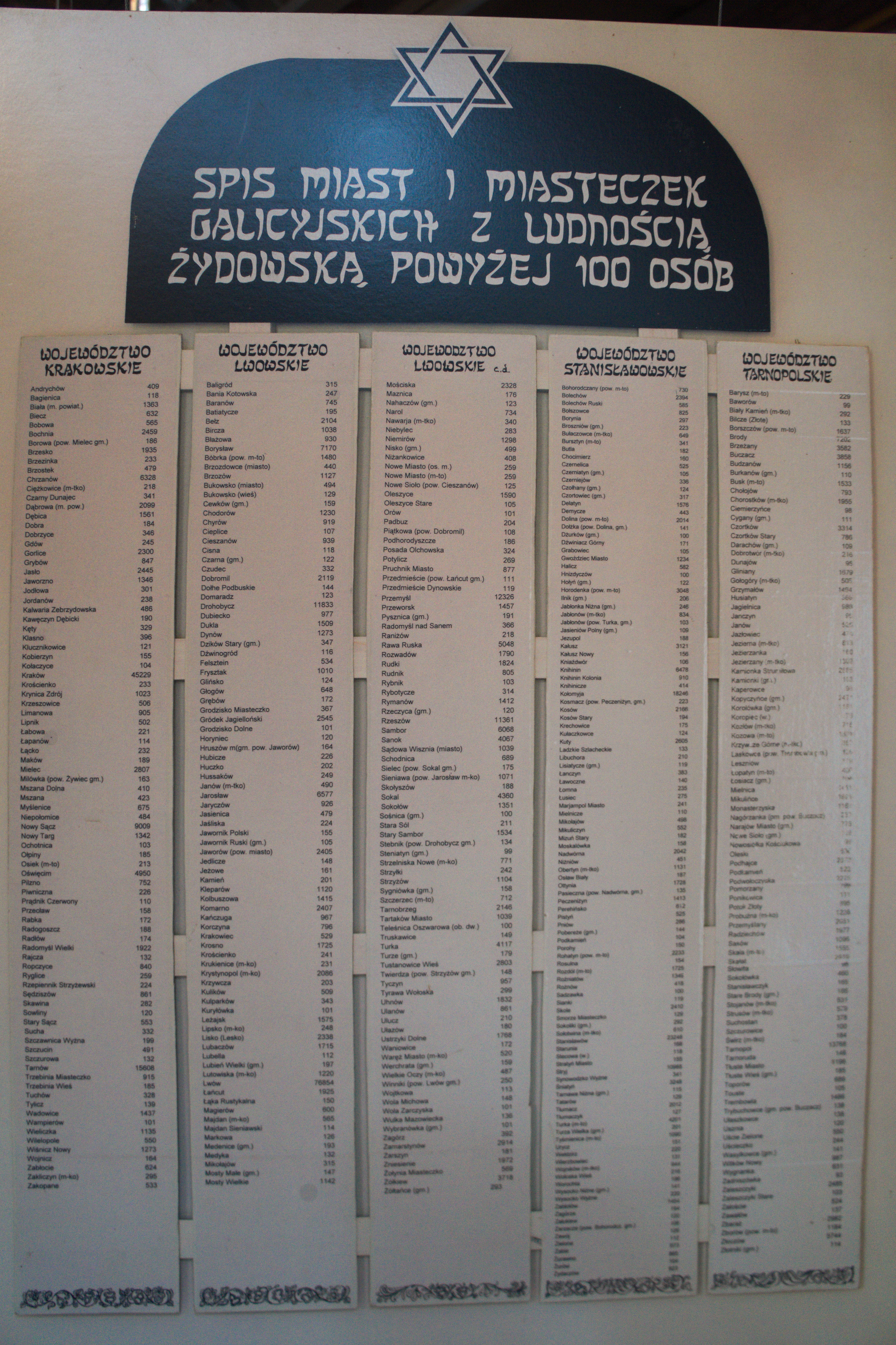
Population of Jews before World War II in Galicia (Lviv 76,854, Kraków 45,229)

Soshana – collector of Worlds. The exhibition presented paintings by Soshana (born 1927 in Vienna), an Austrian artist of Jewish descent, whose output received international acclaim. This was the first exposition of her works in Poland. For Soshana, painting was always (and still is) the fundamental way of experiencing and expressing the world, a way to enter into a dialogue with reality.

In 2013, the museum also housed Empty Void – photographs from Próżna Street; and Gil Cohen-Magen's In Hasidic Circles; preceded by the ethnographic Souvenir, Talisman, Toy (curated by Erica Lehrer, exploring Jewish figurines included "Lucky Jew" figurines); the Roz Jacobs' Memory Project, hailed as extraordinary by Agnieszka Holland; Street art Jewish style murals inspired by the Jewish culture; and the 21x21 profile of 21 Jewish personalities of contemporary Kraków by Bartolomeo Koczenasz, co-produced with the Jewish Community Centre (JCC).

In 2012, exhibitions included Anxiety Holocaust art of Ryszard Apte; and On the Other Side of the Torah Wartime Portraits from Tübingen with audio and video; Wherever I Go, I'm Always Going to Jerusalem... by the School of Fine Arts in Częstochowa competition winners; and photographs of Cracovian Jews Poland and Palestine: Two Lands and Two Skies by Ze’ev (Wilhelm) Aleksandrowicz who was born in Kraków in 1905, and died in Tel Aviv in 1992.

In 2011, exhibitions included Portraits of an Intellectual and Political Landscape sculptural-paintings and serigraphs by Bernard Aptekar from New York City; photography by Yoram Gross in Look Closer; and works by renown American artist Fay Grajower, member of the International Association of Genocide Scholars, entitled Bletern: Images and Words devoted to Polish Yiddish women poets.

== Activities ==
The museum provides opportunities for groups to meet with local recipients of the Polish Righteous Among the Nations Awards as well as Holocaust and concentration camp survivors.

In addition to tours and meetings, the museum's education centre offers workshops, lectures, and seminars on Jewish religion and culture and the Holocaust for different age groups. It is one of the only providers in southern Poland to offer Holocaust education classes on a permanent basis for visiting schools.

The museum regularly hosts klezmer concerts and other cultural events. In 2010, the Galicia Jewish Museum became an official partner of the Austrian Service Abroad.
