= Lawn jockey =

Small statue of a man in jockey clothes

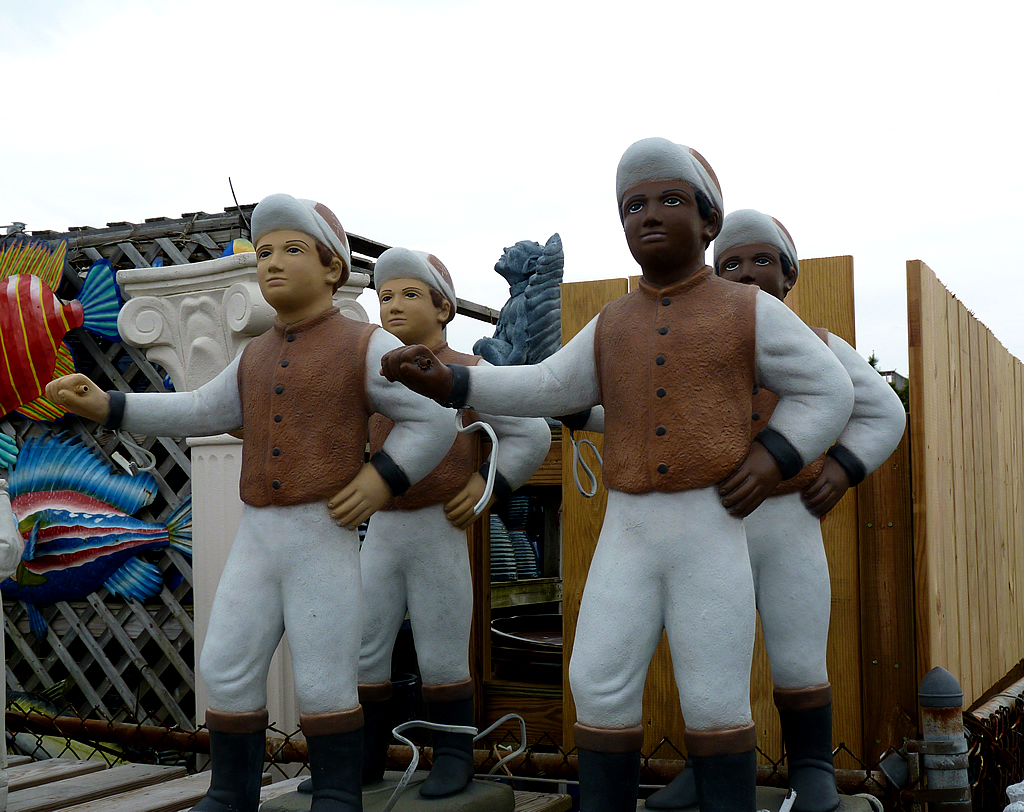
Lawn jockeys

A lawn jockey is a statue depicting a man in jockey clothes, intended to be placed in front yards as hitching posts, similar to those of footmen bearing lanterns near entrances and gnomes in gardens. The lawn ornament, popular in certain parts of the United States and Canada in years past, was a cast replica, usually about half-scale or smaller, generally of a man dressed in jockey's clothing and holding up one hand as though taking the reins of a horse. The hand sometimes carries a metal ring (suitable for hitching a horse in the case of solid concrete or iron versions) and, in some cases, a lantern, which may or may not be operational.

Originally a welcoming symbol to guests and providing to those on horseback a practical and novel hitching post, later statues eventually became only decorative and not well suited for hitching a horse, often favored by those wishing to evoke an Old South or equestrian ambiance.

Historically, black jockeys depicting caricatures of African Americans were commonplace. Several styles have been produced, with the most prolific being a shorter version commonly known as "Jocko" and a taller version known as "cavalier spirit". The former is of stockier build, with a hunched posture; the latter generally is more slender. Typically these statues are made of concrete, but also are made of other materials such as iron, and may be found in polyresin and aluminum.

== Characteristics ==
=== Jocko ===
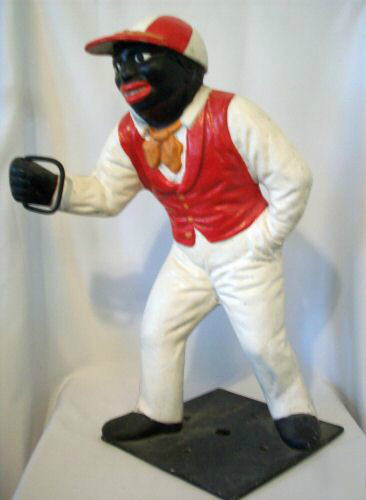
The "Jocko" style hitching post

The earlier "Jocko" design usually depicts the right arm raised, and was styled as a racist caricature of a young black boy, often with exaggerated features, such as big eyes with the whites painted in; large lips painted red; a large, flat nose and curly hair. Typically, these pieces were painted in gaudy colors for the uniform as with racing colors, with the flesh of the statue a gloss black.

=== Cavalier spirit ===
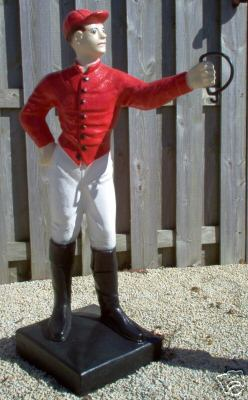
The "cavalier spirit" style hitching post

The "cavalier spirit" design usually depicts the left arm raised and uses the likeness of a white young man, lacking the minstrelsy features of its Jocko counterpart. These statues would also be painted in stark colors, with skin in either gloss black or pastel pink, red lips, etc., white breeches, black boots, and usually with the vest and cap of either bright red or dark green. Occasionally, the vest and cap might be painted in the bright shades of a jockey's racing silks. Several of the "cavalier spirit" jockey statues are prominently displayed at both the entrance of the 21 Club in Manhattan and the entrance of the Santa Anita Park clubhouse in Los Angeles.

A 1947 magazine advertisement uses two images of cavalier-style lawn jockeys to underscore the statue's use as a symbol of the hospitality associated with Old Taylor Kentucky Bourbon, stating: "Jockey hitching posts that invited guests to tarry are an old Kentucky tradition – another sign of a good host."

== History ==
The earliest versions of lawn jockeys, used as hitching posts, were created in the 1850s or early 1860s.

=== Theorized origins ===
Apocryphal accounts of the figure's origin portray the statue as representing a hero of African-American history and culture.

There is a common story that black lawn jockeys are a recreation of a black boy who served George Washington in the Continental Army during the American Revolutionary War. The story says that the boy, named Jocko Graves, was left behind as Washington considered it too dangerous for him to cross the Delaware River with the men. Graves then died in the cold while tending to the men's horses, frozen with a lantern in his hand. According to the Jim Crow Museum of Racist Memorabilia, the legend is not corroborated by historical records.

Another story, popularized by American historian Charles L. Blockson, posits that the figures were used on the Underground Railroad to guide escaping slaves to freedom. Claims of an association with the Underground Railroad have not been corroborated by other historians. The Jim Crow Museum of Racist Memorabilia writes that "there is very little, if any, primary source material for the claim that lawn jockeys were used as signaling devices for escaping slaves on the Underground Railroad."

== In popular culture ==
In media and popular culture, lawn jockeys sometimes appear as a prop or conversation piece, in most cases merely trivial and non-notable in nature, although notable racial connotations are often associated with earlier examples of lawn jockeys versus more modern contemporary examples. Sometimes a reference to a lawn jockey is used to illustrate a racist or race-based point in popular culture. For example, in a Season 1 episode of The Golden Girls, Sophia makes a subtle hint at Blanche's Southern American roots being steeped in racism, suggesting that Blanche "tar and feather the neighbor's lawn jockey" in order to make her father feel at home during his visit to the more liberal city of Miami, Florida. In All in the Family, the gift of a black lawn jockey is bestowed on main character Archie Bunker to annoy him, owing to his reputed racial bigotry, although in an unexpected twist, Archie actually finds the racist gift inappropriate and bothersome, refusing to put it out on his own property. In Season 1, episode 13 of Maude, Arthur refers to a black man protesting slumlords on Maude's front lawn as "so much more animated than those little black jockeys".

Lawn jockeys are often associated with wealthy white American families in popular culture, either for satire and sociopolitical symbolism, or for legitimate aesthetic appeal. Examples of this trend include, but are not limited to, the following:

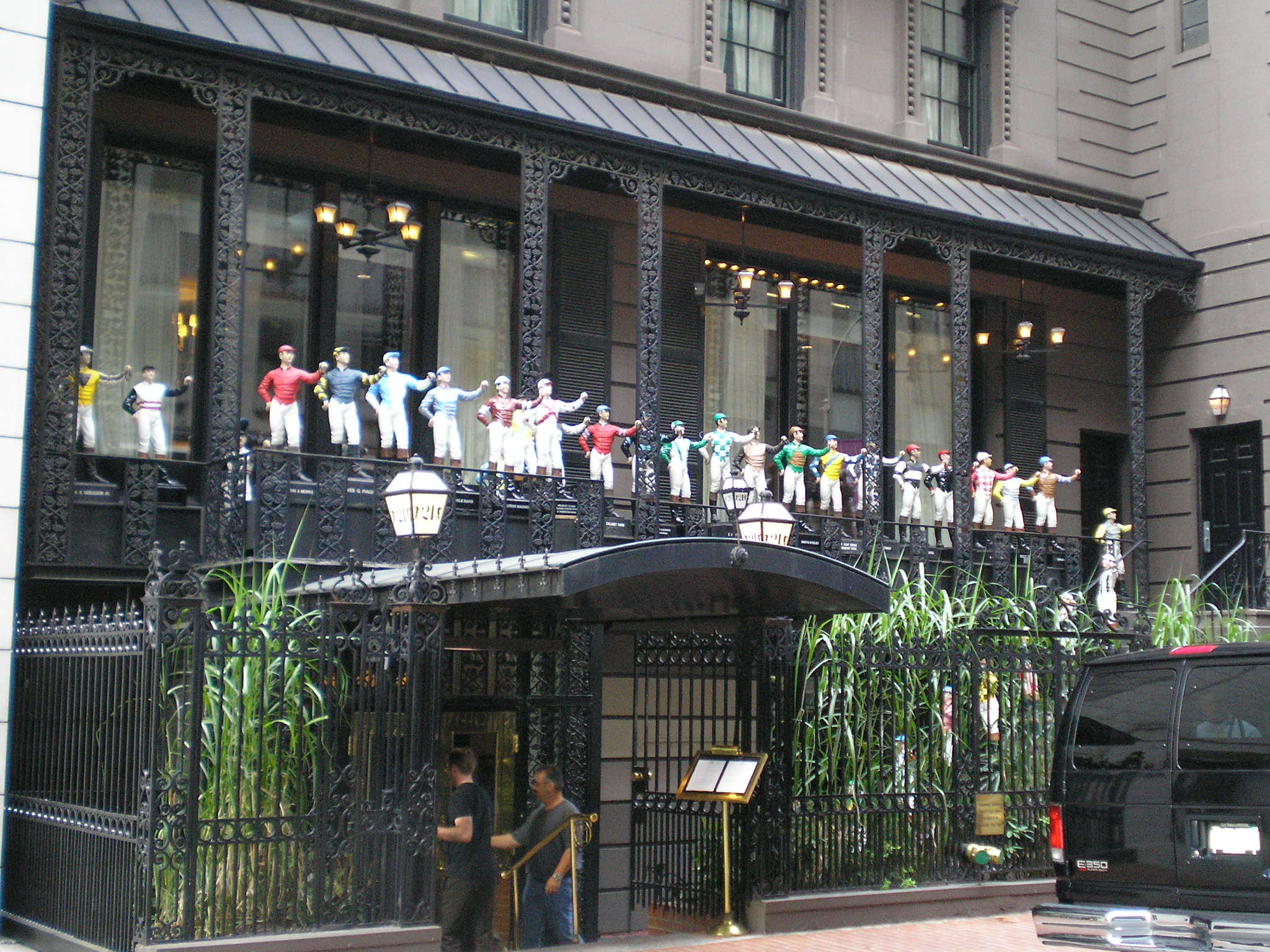
The entrance of the 21 Club in Manhattan used 33 white jockeys to welcome its patrons

- Raymond Chandler's 1942 Philip Marlowe novel The High Window features a lawn jockey decorating the Pasadena home of Marlowe's clients, the wealthy but dysfunctional Murdock family. Marlowe sardonically speaks to the statue several times, regarding it as the family's stablest member.
- A black lawn jockey plays a symbolic role (as well as providing the story's title, in the protagonist's Southern vernacular) in Flannery O'Connor's 1955 short story "The Artificial Nigger".
- The 1997 Vertigo Uncle Sam graphic novel features a sapient lawn jockey (along with several other curios, such as a cigar store Indian) confronting the titular character over the United States' history of racial injustice.
- A lawn jockey comes to life in Stephen King's 2008 novel Duma Key.
- The Negro (Le nèg'), a 2002 film by Québécois director Robert Morin, about a black adolescent who resents lawn jockeys as racist and destroys one, resulting in his murder.
- A lawn jockey and images of lawn jockeys appear in several episodes of Dear White People.
- A lawn jockey was seen in Home Alone getting knocked four times by cars.
- A lawn jockey that comes alive is one of the enemies found in the video game Paperboy.
- Lawn jockeys are often referenced in relation to Blanche Devereaux's Southern family in The Golden Girls, often as a subtle implication that Blanche's family (who lived on a plantation and, historically, owned slaves) are racist. Despite this, Blanche is not racist herself, nor are her children or her father, "Big Daddy" Hollingsworth. It is said at one point that Big Daddy's father, Grandpappy Hollingsworth of Alabama, would get drunk and order a black lawn jockey on the property to "do a little dance".
- A trailer for a film about a deadly lawn jockey appears in the Gwar film Skulhedface.
- The central character in Frank Zappa's song "Uncle Remus" is a Black student protester who vows to visit Beverly Hills in the night and "knock the little jockeys off the rich people's lawns, / And before they get up I'll be gone, I'll be gone".
- There is a racist stereotype version depicting a black man as the jockey on the lawn of the white plantation owner/cotton farmer Endicott in the 1960s Sidney Poitier film In the Heat of the Night.
- Curb Your Enthusiasm's season 12 episode 2 is entitled "The Lawn Jockey". The name refers to one of these statues that are in Larry's Atlanta Airbnb.
- In the Documentary Now! episode "The Bunker" (a parody of The War Room), underhanded political campaigner Teddy Redbones tries to smear Governor Tom Lester by placing black lawn jockeys in Lester voters' front yards.
- In Crank, the final action scene is set on a roof-top lawn with dozens of lawn jockeys, which are destroyed violently. Lawn jockeys also make an appearance in Crank: High Voltage, appearing at the Hollywood Park Racetrack.

== Gallery ==
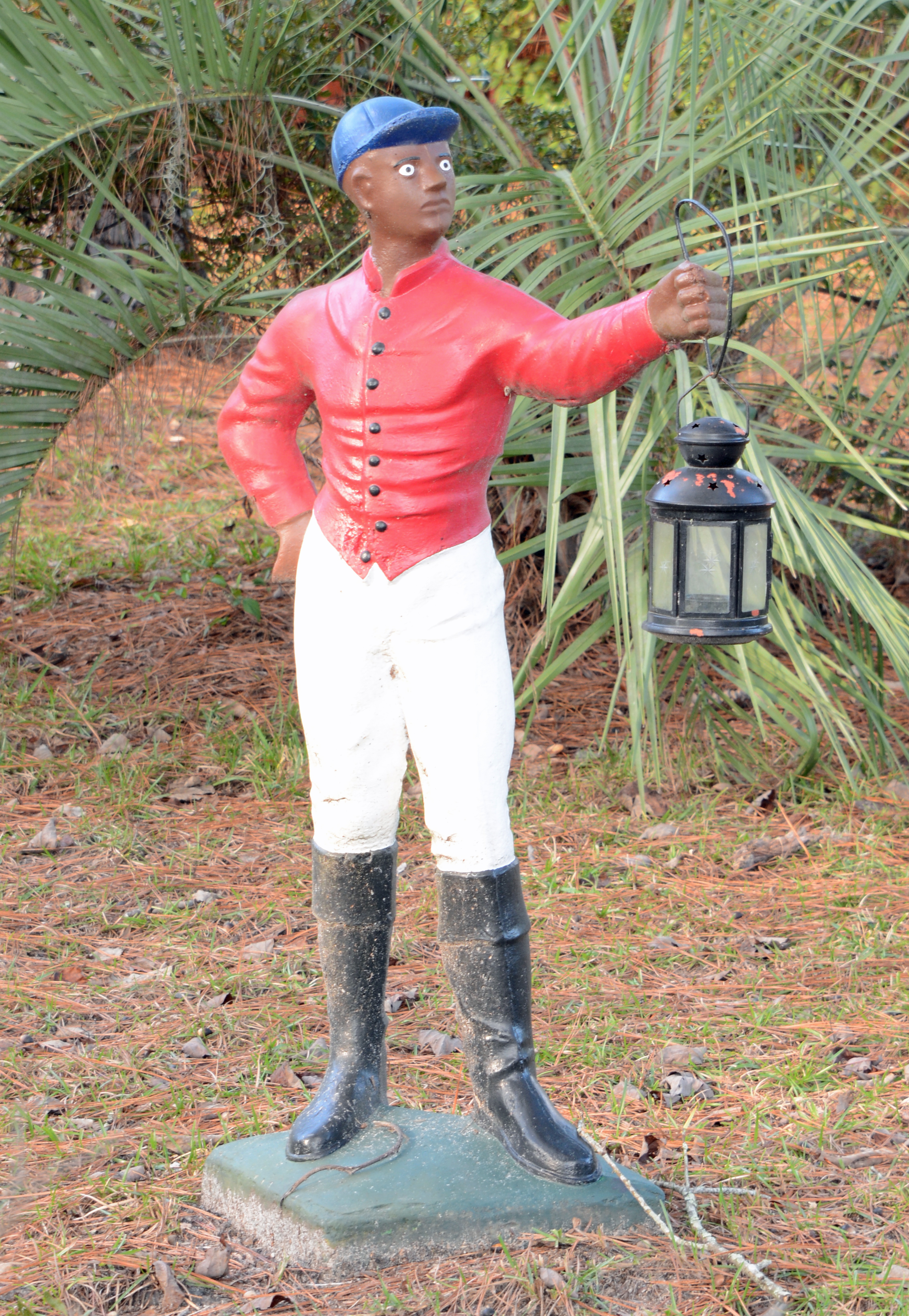
Example bearing a lantern in Guyton, Georgia

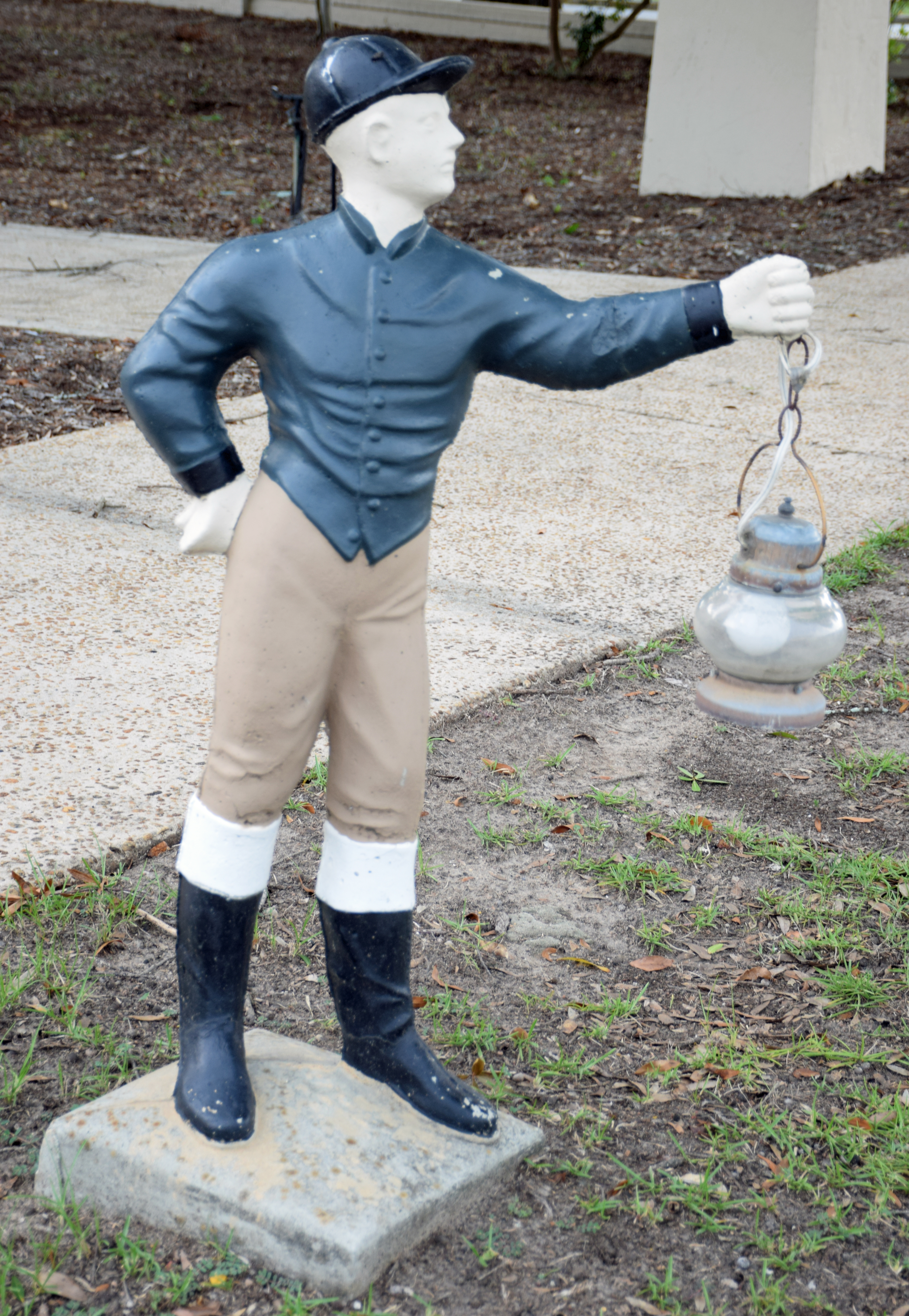
Example bearing a lantern in Perry, Georgia

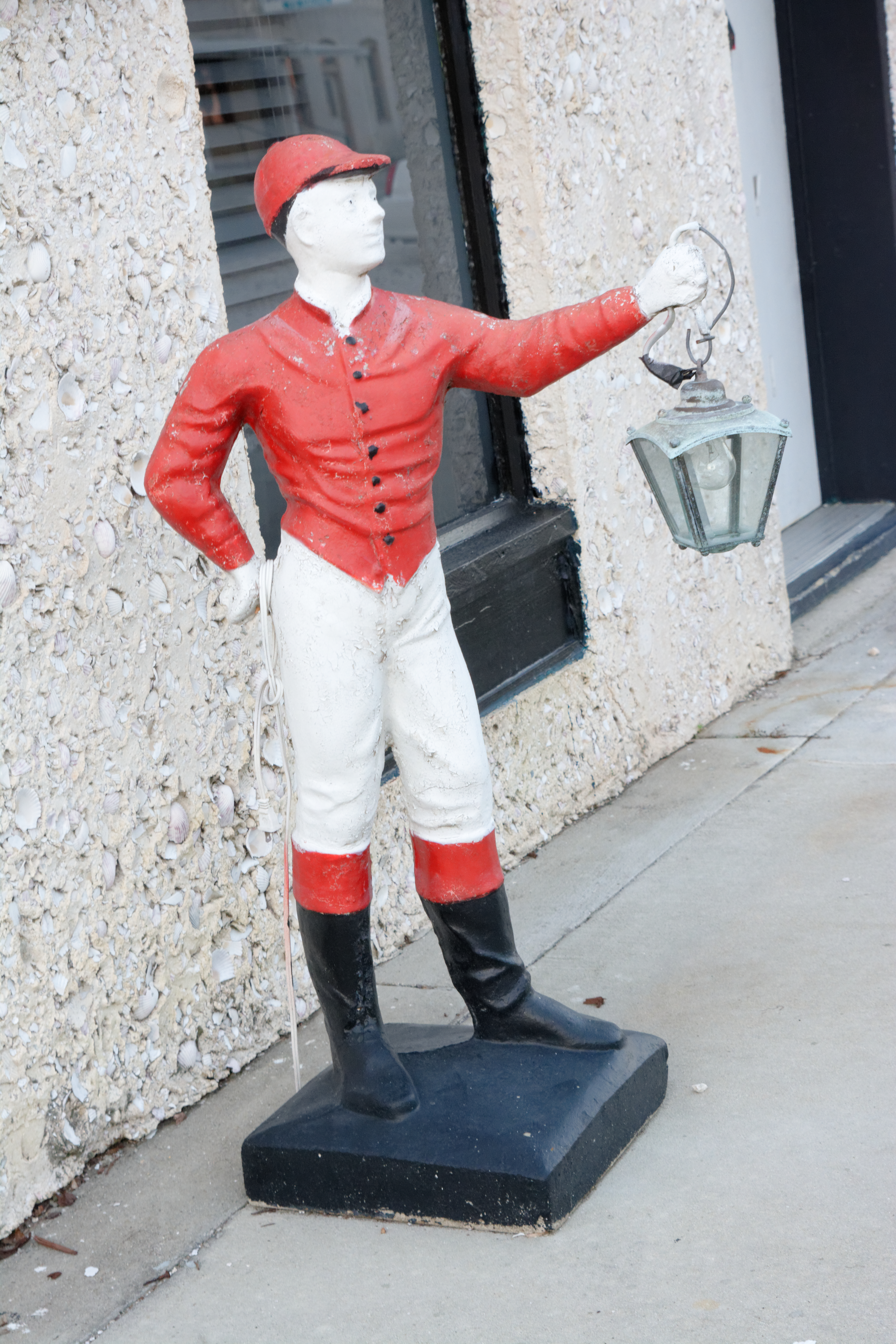
In Darien, Georgia

== See also ==
- Blackamoor
- Concrete Aboriginal
- Garden gnome
- Jew with a coin
- Cigar store Indian
- Representation of African Americans in media
- Stereotypes of African Americans
