= Concrete Aboriginal =

Type of lawn ornament

A Concrete Aboriginal, also known as a Neville, is a lawn ornament once common in Australia. The ornament is a concrete statue depicting an Aboriginal Australian, generally carrying a spear and often standing on one leg. The statues were once common in Australia but rarely seen since the 1980s.

The concrete Aborigine is, at its very core, a symbol of a much simpler time; an Australia that was as unashamedly kitsch as it was unaware of the cultural and political significance of something that, by today's standards, is so brutally offensive the very idea of someone trying to resurrect it as an art form would most likely prompt indignant squealing from the more progressive corners of society.

— Gregor Stronach

The fashion for keeping a concrete Aboriginal in the garden was satirised in the Australian 1980s situation comedy Kingswood Country, where the lead character referred to his concrete Aboriginal as "Neville". The name "Neville" was thought to be a reference to Neville Bonner, the first Aboriginal Australian to sit in the Parliament of Australia.

== See also ==
- Lawn ornament
- Lawn jockey
- Cigar store Indian
- Blackamoor
- Garden gnome
- Jew with a coin
