= Erica Lehrer =

American anthropologist

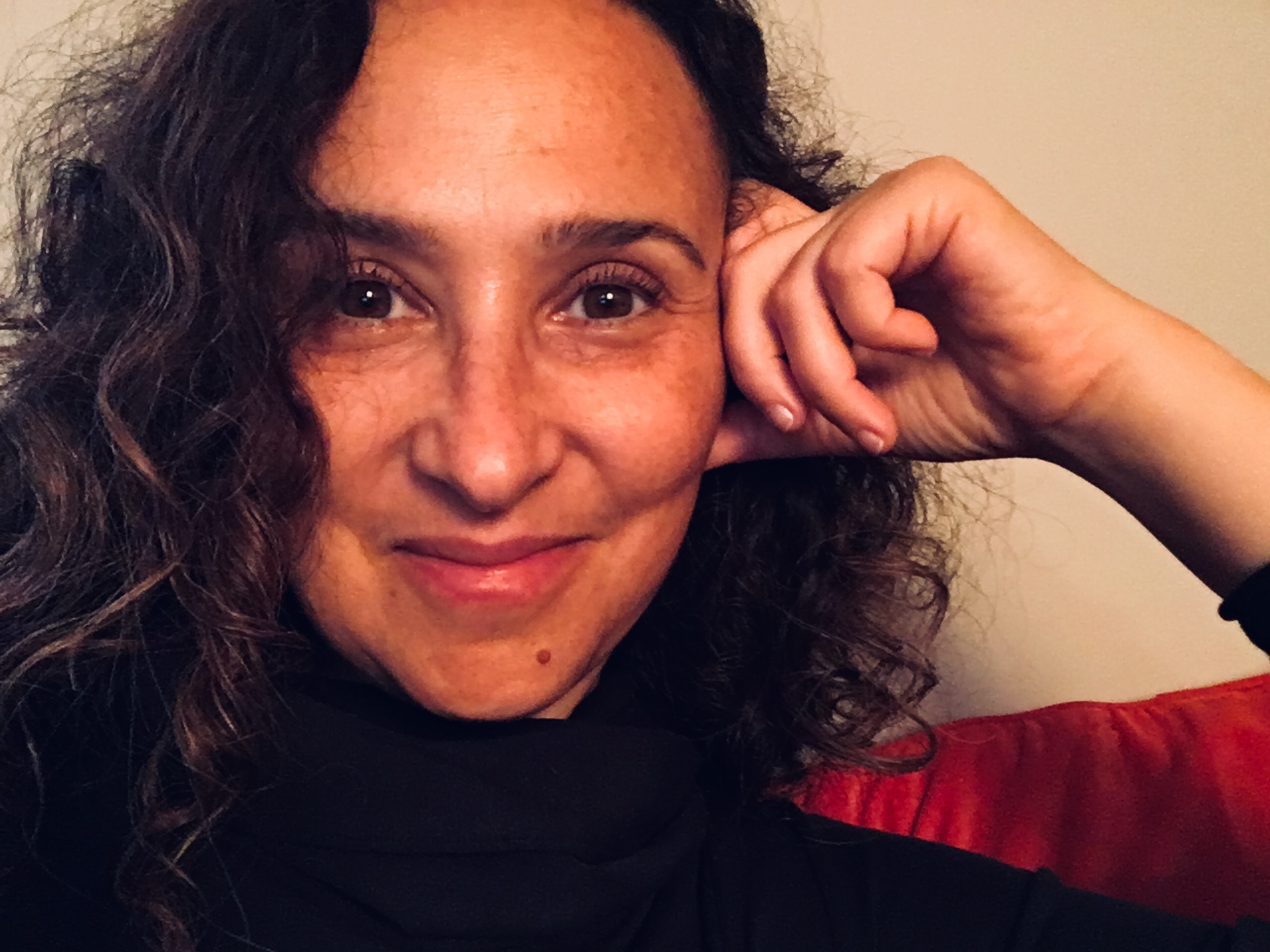
Erica Lehrer, 2019

Erica Lehrer is an anthropologist, curator, and academic specializing in post-Holocaust Jewish culture, decolonial museum studies, ethnography, and public scholarship. She is associate professor of History and Sociology/Anthropology at Concordia University, where she holds a Canada Research Chair in Museum and Heritage Studies and serves as director of the Curating and Public Scholarship Lab at Concordia University.

== Education ==
She has received a B.A. from Grinnell College and M.A. and PhD degrees from the University of Michigan.

== Career ==
In 2013, Lehrer curated "Souvenir, Talisman, Toy," an ethnographic exhibition of historical and contemporary Polish-made figurines depicting Jews (including the modern antisemitic Jew with a coin figurines), at the Ethnographic Museum of Kraków. A smaller selection of objects and media from the exhibit was on display from July 28 – August 30, 2013, at the Galicia Jewish Museum. In 2016, she curated a new exhibition at the Galicia Jewish Museum titled "A Single Point Perspective/Punkt Zbiezny."

In 2026, Lehrer became the subject of public controversy surrounding her planned presentation at Penn State on decolonizing holocaust museums.

== Personal life and family ==
Lehrer's uncle was physicist Frederick Reif, who was married to Mildred Dresselhaus. Her mother, Liane Reif-Lehrer, was a Holocaust survivor and professor at Harvard Medical School. Her brother, Damon Lehrer, is a children's book author.

== Awards ==
- Canada Research Chair in Museum and Heritage Studies
- Canada Research Chair in Post-Conflict Memory, Ethnography and Museology
- Hazel D. Cole Fellowship in Jewish Studies, University of Washington
- Illinois Humanities Post-Doctoral Fellowship, University of Illinois at Urbana-Champaign

== Publications ==
- "Curatorial Dreams: Critics Imagine Exhibitions", McGill-Queen's University Press, 2016, ISBN 978-0-77354683-7
- "Jewish Space in Contemporary Poland", Indiana University Press, 2015, ISBN 978-0-253-01503-7
- Na szczęście to Żyd / Lucky Jews: Poland's Jewish Figurines, Ha!art Press, 2014, ISBN 978-83-64057-42-7
- Jewish Poland Revisited: Heritage Tourism in Unquiet Places, Indiana University Press, 2013, ISBN 978-0-253-00886-2
- co-editor, Curating Difficult Knowledge: Violent Pasts in Public Places, Palgrave Macmillan, 2011, ISBN 978-0-230-29672-5
