= Samuel Anderson Robb =

American sculptor

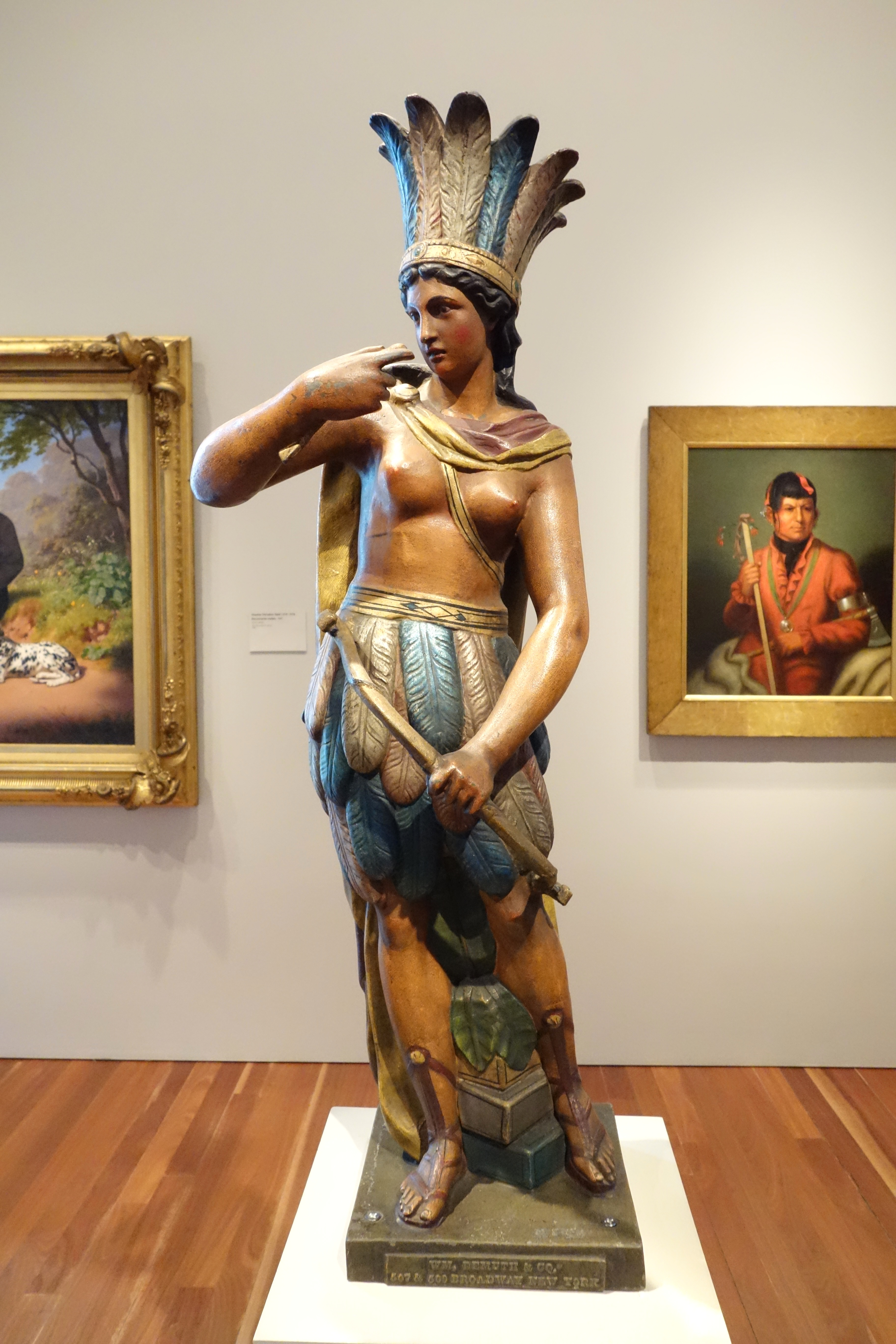
Cigar store figure by Samuel Anderson Robb, William Demuth and Company, New York City, 1870

Samuel Anderson Robb (c. 1851–1928) was an American sculptor, best known for his carved wooden figures for tobacco shops and circus wagons.

Robb was born in New York City, the son of a Scottish shipwright. He apprenticed to a shipbuilder (probably Thomas V. Brooks) for five years, then went to work for a wood-carver, making figures for tobacco shops, and attending night classes at the National Academy of Design and Cooper Union. After his apprenticeship, he worked for William Demuth carving tobacco figures. In 1876 he married Emma Jane Pelham and opened his own carving shop. After Emma died in 1878, Robb married Agnes Loudon in 1881, with whom he had four children. He subsequently left his family, however, and had no communication with them for seventeen years, when he encountered Agnes on the street and the family was reunited.

Robb's workshop was the largest in nineteenth-century New York City. His carvings ranged from traditional cigar store Indians to circus wagons and ventriloquist dummies. The wood used for figures, no matter what use they were put to, was carved from solid white pine logs, which were readily available locally, a soft wood that was easy to carve with hand tools and a relatively inexpensive wood specie. Robb often sourced reclaimed wood in three- to seven-foot sections of masts and spars from dismantled sailing ships that he purchased at spar yards in the maritime district.

He closed his workshop at 114 Centre Street in 1903, after completing a set of circus wagon carvings for Barnum & Bailey.
