= Cigar store Indian =

Advertisement figure

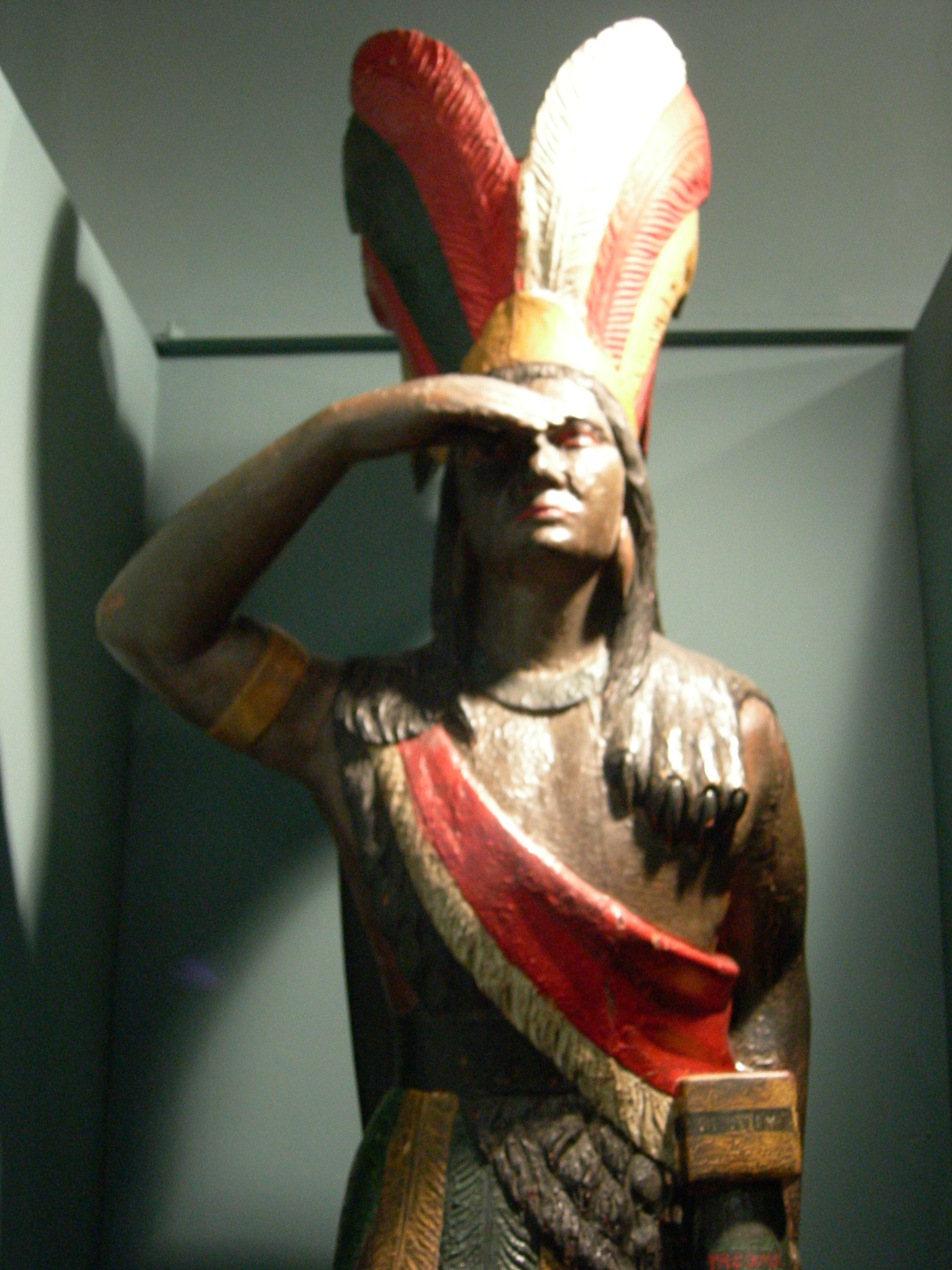
19th-century example from Seattle

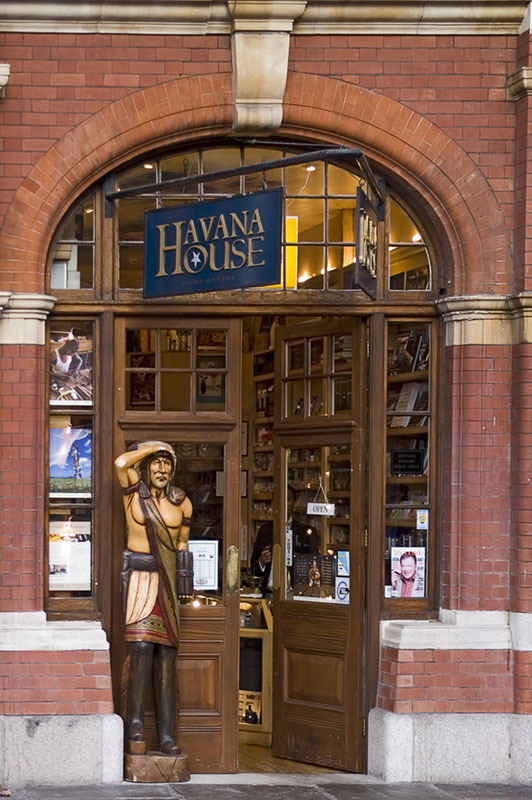
Chief Heckawi in Windsor in 2006

The cigar store Indian or wooden Indian is an advertisement figure, in the likeness of a Native American, used to represent tobacconists. The figures are often three-dimensional wooden sculptures measuring from several feet tall up to life-sized. They are still occasionally used for their original advertising purpose, but are more often seen as decorations or advertising collectibles, with some pieces selling for hundreds of thousands of US dollars.

== History ==
Because of the general illiteracy of the populace, early store owners used descriptive emblems or figures to advertise their shops' wares; for example, barber poles advertise barber shops, show globes advertised apothecaries and three gold balls represented pawn shops. American Indians and tobacco had always been associated because American Indians introduced tobacco to Europeans. As early as the 17th century, European tobacconists used figures of American Indians to advertise their shops.

In 1667, King Charles II passed a law which forbade the use of overhead projecting signs because of the danger presented to passing traffic. A Highlander figure indicated the sale of Scottish snuff, and a Blackamoor figure that tobacco from the Caribbean was available.

Because European carvers had never seen a Native American, these early cigar-store "Indians" looked more like Africans with feathered headdresses and other fanciful, exotic features. These carvings were called "Black Boys" or "Virginians" in the trade. Eventually, the European cigar-store figure began to take on a more "authentic" yet highly stylized native visage, and by the time the smoke-shop figure arrived in the Americas in the late 18th century, it had become thoroughly "Indian."

According to an 1890 article in The New York Times:

It appears that the first man to introduce carved figures as tobacconists' signs was a certain Chichester. They were carved by one Tom Millard. This was about forty years ago. John Cromwell, Nick Collins, Thomas V. Brooks, and Thomas White are also prominent figures in the early history of the art.... Most of the men in the business originally carved figureheads for ships. But with the decay of American shipping they lost their occupation.... [S.A.] Robb himself brought a good artistic training to the workshop, for he studied at the Academy of Design for a number of years.

The Times further notes that as the market became saturated with Indians, popular taste expanded to figures of Scotchmen, English officers with bearskins, Dolly Vardens, John L. Sullivan, Edwin Forrest in Roman garb, Turks, sultanas, Punch (of Punch and Judy), and plantation Blacks. The price of a small Indian was then $16, and full custom figures might cost $125. Most figures, however, were simply copied from existing ones.

The Times article describes traditional fabrication techniques as follows. The wood was typically white pine, bought as logs at spar yards. The artist first blocked out a very rough outline by axe, guided by paper patterns. A hole was then bored into each end of the log, about 5 inches in depth, and a bolt placed into each. The log was then suspended from these bolts on supports so it could freely turn. The sculptor then used chisels, followed by finer carving tools, to create the finished figure. Arms and hands were created separately, then screwed into the body. The last steps were to paint it and set it up upon a stand.

== Modern times ==
The cigar store Indian became less common in the 20th century for a variety of reasons. Sidewalk-obstruction laws dating as far back as 1911 were one cause. Later issues included higher manufacturing costs, restrictions on tobacco advertising, and increased sensitivity towards depictions of Native Americans, all of which relegated the figures to museums and antique shops. Many also were destroyed during scrap drives for metal and wood during World War I and World War II. Cigar store figures are now viewed as folk art, and some models have become collector's items, drawing prices up to $500,000. Modern replicas of cigar store Indians are still made for sale, some as cheap as $600.

People within the Native American community often view such likenesses as offensive for several reasons. Some object because they are used to promote tobacco use as recreational instead of ceremonial. Others object that they perpetuate a "noble savage" or "Indian princess" caricature or inauthentic stereotypes of Native people, implying that modern individuals "are still living in tepees, that we still wear war bonnets and beads," drawing parallels to the African-American lawn jockey.

Mining the Museum, an important postmodernist exhibition of the Maryland Historical Society collection curated by Fred Wilson, prominently featured a room of cigar store Indians faced away from the viewer looking towards walls lined with pictures of "real" Native American figures.

== See also ==
- Blackamoor
- Concrete Aboriginal
- Jew with a coin
- Lawn jockey
