= Blackamoor (decorative arts) =

Type of figure in European decorative art

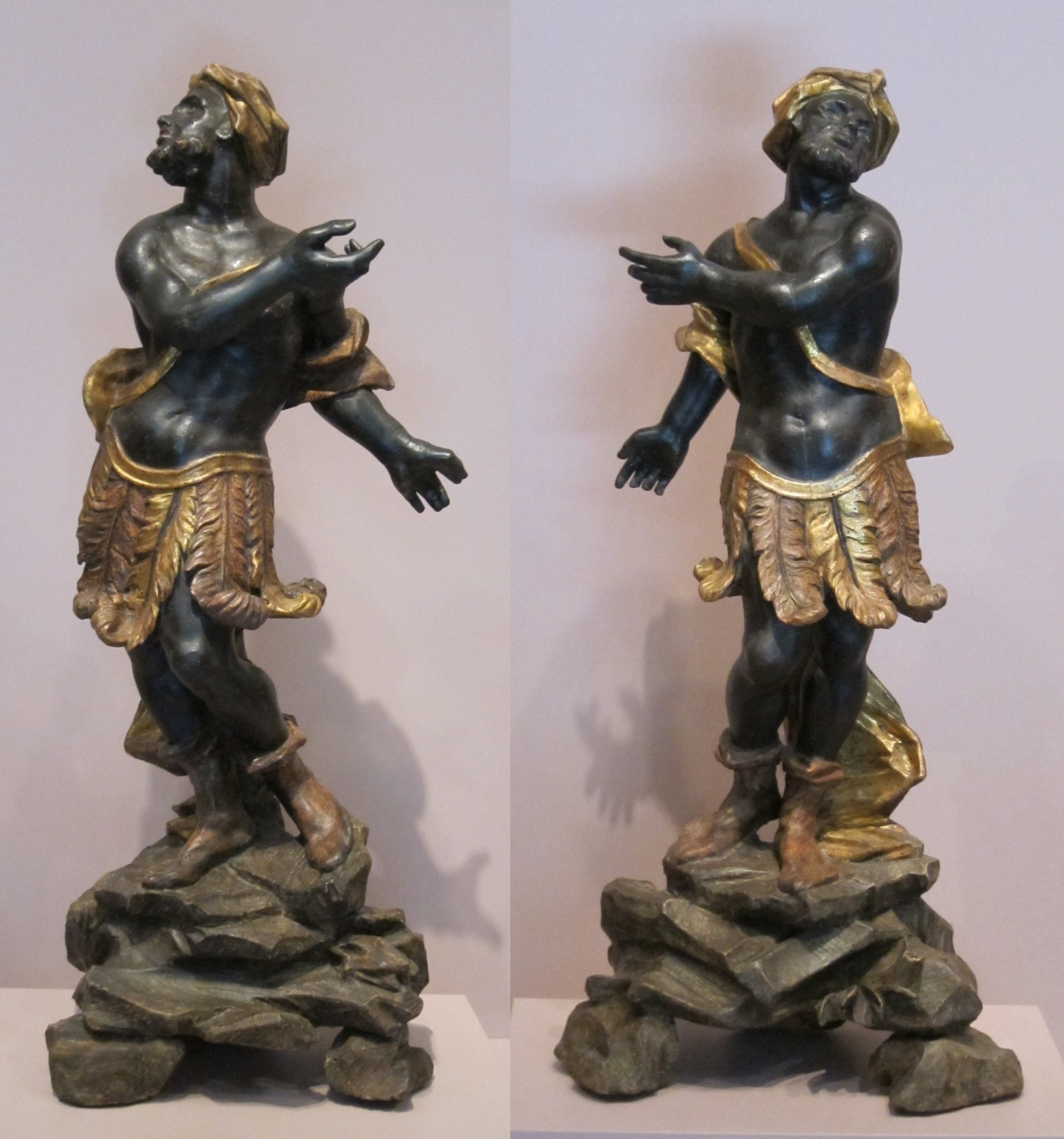
Pair of Italian figures in painted wood, 18th century

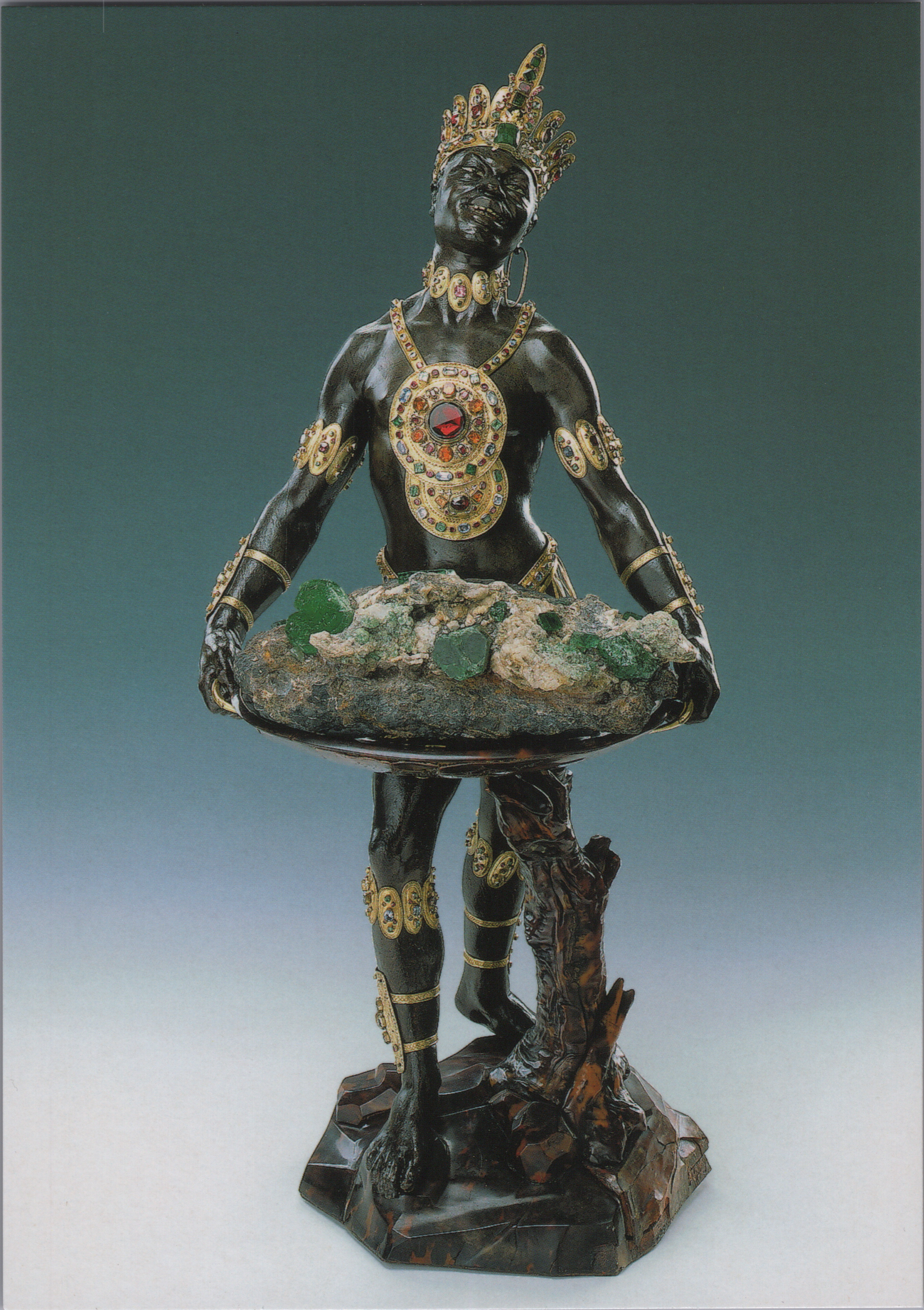
"Moor with Emerald Cluster" by Balthasar Permoser in the collection of the Grünes Gewölbe

Blackamoor is a type of figure and visual trope in European decorative art, typically found in works from the Early Modern period, depicting a man of sub-Saharan African descent, usually in clothing that suggests high status. Common examples of items and objects decorated in the blackamoor style include sculpture, jewellery, and furniture. Typically the sculpted figures carried something, such as candles or a tray. They were thus an exotic and lightweight variant for the "atlas" in architecture and decorative arts, especially popular in the Rococo period.

The term "blackamoor" or "black moor" was once a general term for black people in English, "formerly without depreciatory force" as the Oxford English Dictionary puts it. The style is now viewed by some as racist and culturally insensitive. However, blackamoor pieces are still produced, mainly in Venice, Italy.

== Jewelry and decorative arts ==
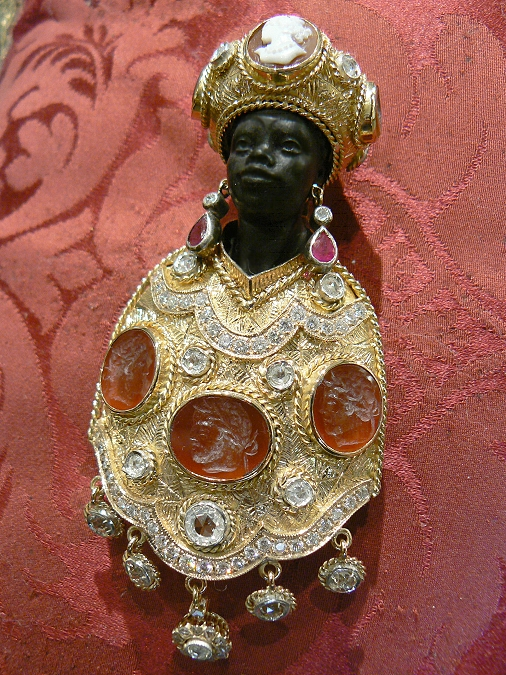
Moretto Veneziano (Sultano)

In jewelry, blackamoor figures usually appear in antique Venetian earrings, bracelets, cuff links, and brooches (Moretto Veneziano). Blackamoor jewelry is also traditionally produced, based on legends found in Fiume, such as earrings and brooches under the name Morčić or Moretto Fiumano.

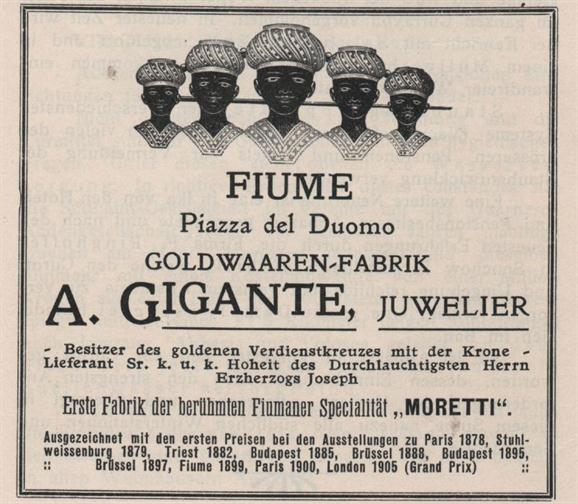
Advertisement for a jewellery store in Fiume (today Rijeka, Croatia), early 20th century)

Some contemporary craftspeople continue to make individual pieces; however, production of blackamoor jewelry is becoming more rare, due to the decorative style increasingly being viewed as problematic and offensive for its depiction of dark-skinned people as "exotic" and decorative.

Blackamoor figures are typically male, sometimes depicted with a head covering such as a turban. Sculptures are typically carved from ebony, or painted black to contrast with the bright colors of the embellishments. Depictions may only represent the head, or head and shoulders, facing the viewer in a symmetrical pose.

In decorative sculpture, the full body is depicted, either to hold trays as a servant figure, or bronze sconces to hold candles or light fixtures. They may be incorporated into small stands, tables, or andirons, and are often portrayed in pairs. Often, blackamoor figures are depicted in acrobatic positions that would be physically impossible to hold for any extended length of time. Notable sculptors of blackamoor figures include Andrea Brustolon (1662–1732), who is considered by some to be the most important artist of blackamoor sculptures.

=== Collections ===
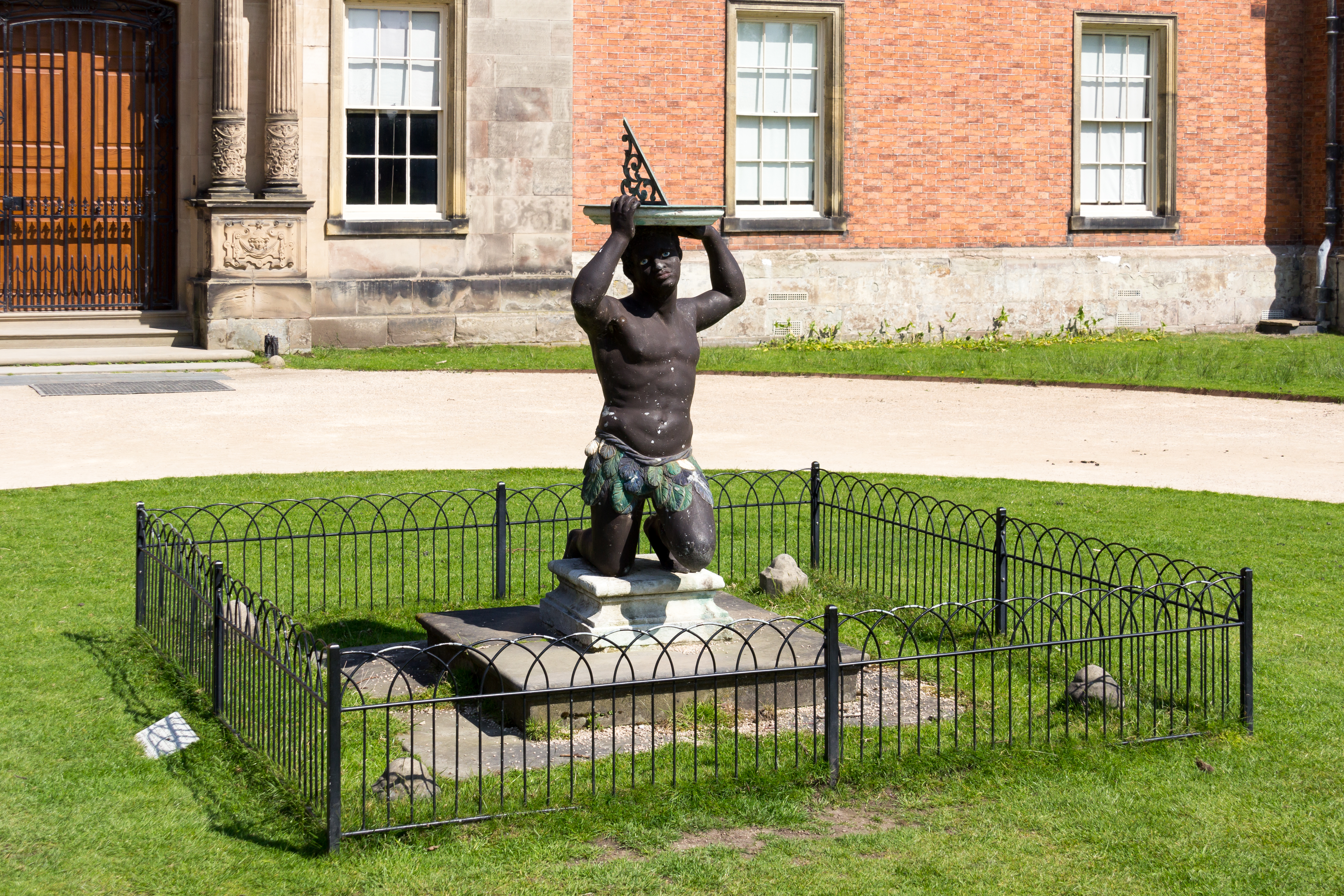
The "kneeling slave" holding a sundial on his head outside Dunham Massey Hall was removed by the National Trust in 2020 after the murder of George Floyd for its degrading depiction.

The Mohr mit Smaragdstufe ("Moor with Emerald Cluster"), in the collection of the Grünes Gewölbe in Dresden, Germany, created by Balthasar Permoser in 1724, is a richly decorated statue with jewels, 63.8 cm (25.1 in) tall.

The Dunham Massey Hall sundial depicts a blackamoor carrying the sundial above his head. From the period of the Atlantic slave trade, it has also been categorised as a 'kneeling slave'. The statue was set up as one monument to honour the 1st Earl of Warrington by his son, the second Earl in c. 1735. It was cast after a model by John Nost I for William III of England's Privy Garden at Hampton Court Palace. In June 2020, the National Trust removed the Grade II-listed statue from the forecourt of Dunham Massey Hall.

Aleksandr Pushkin had a blackamoor figurine on his desk to remind him of Abram Petrovich Gannibal, his great-grandfather. This figure can be seen in his former St. Petersburg apartment, now turned into a museum.

Vogue editor Diana Vreeland had a famous collection of blackamoor figurines and blackamoor jewelry and famously said: “Have I ever showed you my little blackamoor heads from Cartier with their enameled turbans? I'm told it's not in good taste to wear blackamoors anymore, but I think I'll revive them." Civil rights activist and pop star Anita Pointer of the Pointer Sisters has some blackamoor pieces in her extensive collection of black memorabilia that she started in the 1970s. As a child, she witnessed extreme racial oppression in her mother's hometown, Prescott. When she started traveling abroad, she was amazed that she could find collectible pieces in other parts of the world that told the same story as Black American history.

== Heraldry ==
In heraldry, a blackamoor may be a charge in the blazon, or description of a coat of arms. The isolated head of a moor is blazoned "a Maure" or a "moor's head".

The reasons for the inclusion of a blackamoor head vary. The Moor's head on the crest that appears on the arms of Lord Kirkcudbright, and in consequence the modern crest badge used by Clan MacLellan is supposed to derive from the killing of a moorish bandit known as Black Morrow. The blazon is a naked arm supporting on the point of a sword, a moor's head.

== Sculpture ==
Blackamoor figures were also used in larger sculptures, such as on Blackamoor Bridge in Ulriksdal Palace, Sweden.

Fred Wilson, an African-American sculptor, displayed an installation at the 2003 Venice Biennale that incorporated blackamoors. Wilson placed wooden blackamoors carrying acetylene torches and fire extinguishers. Wilson noted that such figures are so common in Venice, few people notice them. He said, "They are in hotels everywhere in Venice ... which is great, because all of a sudden you see them everywhere. I wanted it to be visible, this whole world which sort of just blew up for me."

== Racism ==
In the late 20th century, scholars in the interdisciplinary fields of cultural studies, ethnic studies, and art history began calling attention to the problematic depictions of Blackamoor decorative arts, underscoring the significance of race as a cultural construct during the Renaissance. Blackamoor art depicted a "hybrid of the African Black and the Muslim Moor," giving representation to and taming the European anxiety about non-European "others." Scholar Ella Shohat has argued that this melding of different contexts in Blackamoor art highlights Europe's self-definition in relation to colonialism and its exoticised "others," and is consistent with what she terms post-Enlightenment Orientalist scholarship, as exemplified in the University of London's "School of Oriental and African Studies."

Displaying or wearing blackamoor decorative art in the 21st century has come under criticism, as Princess Michael of Kent found when she wore a Blackamoore brooch to a luncheon with Meghan Markle. Art historian Adrienne L. Childs also criticised the "romanticised" depictions and interpretations of blackamoor pieces, arguing that the depictions of black people in the blackamoor style obscured and made palatable the existence of slaves in the colonies, and evidenced "a culture that marginalised and dominated blacks". In 2020, the American interior decorating magazine House Beautiful then criticized Blackamoor decorative art. The UK magazine Varsity criticized it as racist in the same week.

Due to the high monetary value of Blackamoor statues, contemporary owners and curators have continued to display them while attempting to minimize their racist history. According to contemporary critics, "critical curatorial intervention" could "highlight issues of racial discrimination and European elitism," bringing greater awareness to the ways that their 18th-century owners sought, through possession and display of these objects, to convey both the reach of Venetian and European power and the owner's worldly and accomplished status within that realm. Such an approach would place these works in historical context and call into question colonial relations and the legacies of their depictions.

== See also ==
- Black Madonna
- Cigar store Indian
- Jew with a coin
- Lawn jockey
- Concrete Aboriginal
- Representation of slavery in European art
