= Jew with a coin =

Polish good luck charm

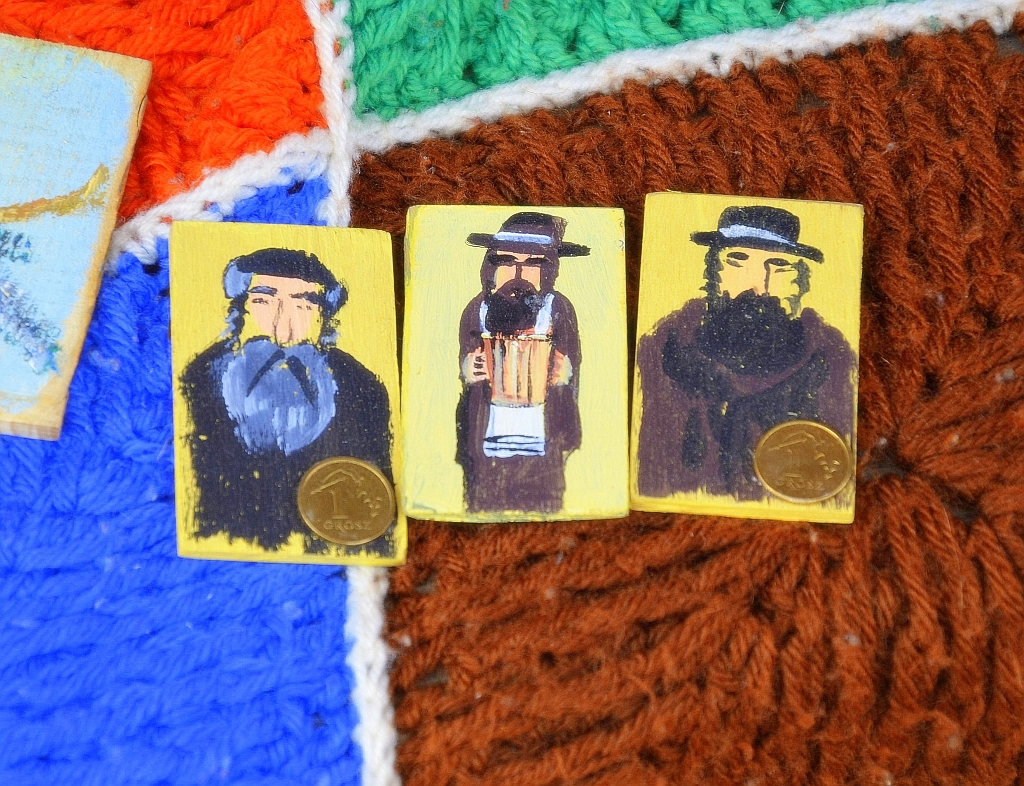
"Jew with a coin" charms

The Jew with a coin (Żyd z pieniążkiem), also little Jew (Żydki) or lucky Jew ("Żyd na szczęście"), is a good-luck charm in Poland and elsewhere, where images or figurines of the character, usually accompanied by a proverb, are said to bring good fortune, particularly financially. The motif was first described in articles from 2000, and probably dates back to the early 1990s.

Scholars offer various interpretations of the motif's nature and origin, though they generally agree that it is used as a talisman for good luck, in particular financial good luck. Opinions about the motif vary; some scholars believe it promotes Polish–Jewish dialogue or view it as harmless folklore or nostalgia, while others believe it is an antisemitic and offensive stereotype. Due to the latter view, the figurines have sometimes been criticized and called controversial as they have been connected to the traditional antisemitic canard of the Jewish moneylender.

== Usage and customs ==
The figurines are used as a good luck charm in the hope of becoming rich, and are often given as gifts. Some are sold with "instruction manuals" how to use them to bring good fortune. It is advised to turn them upside down on the Sabbath (Friday night or Saturdays) or place a coin (grosz, 1/100 of a złoty) in an azid behind the image so that money and good fortune may fall upon the household. At homes the images are to be placed in the entrance hall to the left of the door (probably akin to mezuzah). The figurines are also placed in offices and in shops next to cash registers. According to a 2015 survey in Poland, 50 percent of respondents knew of the superstition of good fortune, 24 percent of the custom to place a grosz behind the frame, and 13 percent of turning it upside down on the Sabbath.

The motif is often accompanied by sayings. The saying Żyd w sieni, pieniądz w kieszeni ("Jew in the hall, coin in your pocket") has roots pre-dating World War II. The original meaning of the saying was that as long as the Jew stayed at the entrance of the house the money in the house remained safe, but in contemporary popular usage the meaning has been reversed: the Jew in the hall brings fortune to the house. Joanna Tokarska-Bakir stresses that: "Given the power of connotations associated with contemporary history, this maxim takes on a bitter meaning, as it alludes to how Poles enriched themselves when they protected the Jews". The saying Kto nie ma w domu Żyda, temu bida ("He who has no Jew at home is moneyless") is based on Kiedy bida, to do Żyda ("When poverty is there, go to the Jew"), referring originally to Jewish moneylenders and also dating prior to World War II. Modern variants have also arisen and accompany the motif, for instance: Aby kasa w domu była, I się nigdy nie skonczyła, Żyda w domu trzeba mieć! We pieniędzy będzie strzec ("So that the money stays at home, and that it does not leave, keep a Jew in your house, he will keep the cash").

=== Survey ===
According to a 2015 survey conducted by Paweł Dobrosielski, Piotr Majewski and Justyna Nowak in Poland, 65% of respondents recognized the motif, 55% saw the motif at the home of family or friends, and 18% had such an object. There was no correlation between respondent age and recognition of the motif, an affirmation that the motif is a recent introduction. 50% of respondents were aware of the superstition that it brings financial good luck, 24% were aware of the practice of placing a grosz behind the frame, and 13% of turning it upside down on the Sabbath. Some 16% of respondents performed one of these rituals.

According to Dobrosielski, the low level of knowledge and practice of the associated superstitions in contrast to the high level of recognition may be explained by the motif being a recent phenomenon, with accompanying superstitions not yet established in a habitual fashion as older superstitions are. Dobrosielski notes that women were more likely than men to practice the superstitions associated with the motif, as well as other superstitions. Dobrosielski finds further affirmation for the recentness of the phenomenon when he contrasts his results with the results of a survey on general superstitions in Poland, which found that 39% of respondents practiced five common superstitions such as finger crossing. Dobrosielski's final portion of the survey asked a series of questions related to antisemitic prejudice, based on questions used by sociologist Antoni Sułek. Sułek's respondents when queried on "whether Jews have too much influence on Poland's affairs" answered in the affirmative 43% in 2002 and 22% in 2010, whereas Dobrosielski in 2015 found a rate of 33% (correlated with age, inversely correlated with financial wellbeing and education). Dobrosielski notes that the figurines are weakly based in cultural context, and are not popular compared to other good luck charms and rituals.

Some 50% of respondents viewed the motif as a talisman for financial luck (with 18% disagreeing, others did not know), 43% as a good luck charm (with 20% disagreeing), 23% as a regional souvenir (31% disagreeing), and 15% as a talisman for protection of house and family (33% disagreeing). Dobrosielski notes with surprise that few respondents saw the image at shops (27%), the internet (21%), or service location such as restaurants (12%) while multiple academic and journalistic pieces have stated it is ubiquitous in such places. Dobrosielski explains the discrepancy by suggesting that the motif, which is often on small objects, is easy to miss in a location with a multitude of other items in particular when customers have an intent to purchase something else.

=== Bans ===
In June 2021 the city of Kraków announced its plans to ban the sale of Jew with a Coin figurines in public events, A statement calling for this ban was issued by a committee of Krakowian cultural professionals who had investigated the "Jew with a coin" phenomenon, arguing that:

"A Jew for Fortune" falls within the broad spectrum of discriminatory attitudes in which ridicule, scorn, and caricature bear traces of anti-Semitism. Representatives of the art community, Members of the European Parliament, academics involved with ethnology, sociology, history or Jewish studies, urban activists, Jews from Poland and abroad have written appeals regarding these controversial mementos... They are also compared by Diaspora Jews... and by many scholars to such anti-Semitic phenomena as burning a Jewish effigy, the custom of beating Judas or the presence of caricatures of Jews in extreme right-wing brochures and publications.

It was the report of the 48-member round table Towards the Phenomenon of the "Lucky Jew" in Poland, which also stated that "the presence of Jewish figurines with money in souvenir stores and fairs is unequivocally perceived as a proof of lack of reflection and sensitivity in the area of the so-called 'difficult heritage'... [the] participants declare that the city, which lost almost all of its Jewish inhabitants as a result of World War II, must take all possible steps to prevent the presence of this phenomenon in the public space."

== Ethnographic analysis ==
=== Origins ===
Research by Erica Lehrer, who curated the Souvenir, Talisman, Toy exhibit at the Ethnographic Museum of Kraków, shows that while figurines of Jews existed in the past in Poland the contemporary figurines connecting traditionally dressed Jews with financial motifs like coins is recent. Prior to the Second World War, Jewish figurines were present in Christmas and Easter rituals and in particular in the Emaus Easter market fair in Kraków. During the communist era in Poland figurines of Jews were available for sale in the Cepelia ethnic art stores. The figurines with the coins were first described in articles from 2000 whose authors state the phenomenon is recent, and that the figurines probably date back to the times following the transition of government in 1989.

Scholars have looked at a number of dimensions of the "Jew with a coin" figurines, paintings and associated products. One of those is the stereotypical connection between Jews and money. According to Polish scholar of Jewish history Bożena Umińska-Keff, while Jews were stereotypically associated with money and financial gain for many centuries, the rise of the coin imagery in post-communist Poland is not coincidental as Jews have become equated in Poland with success in the capitalistic West that post-1989 Poland aspires to catch up to. Sociologist Ewa Tartakowsky ties the popularity of the figurines to the even more recent growth of public discourse on the Holocaust in Poland, that began with Jan T. Gross's publication of Neighbors: The Destruction of the Jewish Community in Jedwabne, Poland (2001).

According to historian and sociologist Alina Cała, three points of reference stand out in the figurines. The first is reminiscent of figurines in the traditional Emaus Easter fair, the second is black magic, whereas the third is the traditional antisemitic caricature of the Jewish moneylender which was exploited in Nazi and antisemitic Polish iconography. However, whereas classical moneylender tropes often presented assimilated Jews, the current Polish figurines present Jews in traditional Orthodox dress. Cała also notes that, most likely after a complaint from a tourist, currently the figurines being sold in the Kazimierz neighborhood feature the Star of David instead of a coin.

According to Polish anthropologist Joanna Tokarska-Bakir, the figurines fill a role similar to a series of other domestic demons – in this case protecting Polish homes that were "purified of Jews". Tokarska-Bakir says that given that Polish society has enriched itself as a result of the "disappearance" of the Jews, the custom is grotesque – a demonism transformed into a triviality. Turning to Sigmund Freud's Totem and Taboo, Tokarska-Bakir contrasts the Polish custom with totemic religion, which is the product of guilty sons attempting to atone for the founding murder of legendary horde leaders. Cast in this manner, Tokarska-Bakir considers the grotesque practice as less irrational – the protection of the home by the Jew who was expelled from the home being a twisted sign of moral initiation. Tokarska-Bakir's analysis, first published in the weekend edition of Gazeta Wyborcza, was followed by mocking and outraged responses Paweł Jędrzejewski of the Forum of Polish Jews rejected the claims of antisemitism of the figures and pointed out the desire to obtain wealth and the positive image of Jews as being professional and the high income of Jewish Americans. Ethnologist Ludwik Stomma described her analysis as "it is difficult to have something more tangled up" and suggested her views are based on outdated 19th-century work. Stomma pointed out that some of the definitions used by Tokarska-Bakir are difficult to understand, such as "father substitute" or "freed women". According to Stomma, Tokarska-Bakir should know that there were never "totemic religions". In response, Tokarska-Bakir said that readers will remember Sigmund Freud long after they forget Stomma.

Cultural studies scholar Paweł Dobrosielski, who performs a vernacular culture analysis, reaches the same conclusion as Tokarska-Bakir. Dobrosielski states the motif draws on prior Jewish and money stereotypes, but tamed and redirected to a positive meaning in supporting Poles seeking wealth. Dobrosielski sees the motif as a "reaction to the feeling of isolation produced by the highly complex Polish discourse on the Holocaust, and simultaneously by the internalization (via taking into account common interpretations) and contestation (via inverting its meaning) of that discourse". According to Dobrosielski the image disturbs mostly researchers and publicists, and for most Poles the Jew with a coin seems harmless, a friendly practice connected to a positive view of Jews. Dobrosielski writes that the debate among academics is conducted in an isolated circulation, where specialist knowledge invokes context of multilayered history of antisemitic prejudice, which is however absent from practice in real social life. Dobrosielski also notes that high recognition of the figures could be influenced by the very debate by scholars which made them visible to a public audience.

According to Tartakowsky, even if the figurines are not an expression of antisemitism, they are affected by the dis-inhibition of xenophobic rhetoric and marking of those designated as "enemies of the state". Tartakowsky notes that freedom of expression in post-1989 Poland is reflective of the American model, as opposed to the French one, favoring freedom of expression over the outlawing of hate speech. Tartakowsky ties the placement of the image to the left of the doorway to likely mockery of the mezuzah in Jewish custom. Tartakowsky notes the reappropriation of Jewish figurines is deeply ambiguous, but is troubling due to the modern political context and stereotyping.

According to Umińska-Keff, while the phenomena of antisemitism lacks recognition in modern Poland, the old antisemitic myths are still repeated and are even perceived as factual. Umińska-Keff asserts that the imagery and superstitions surrounding the figurines contain all the basic elements of antisemitism – a non-personalized soulless man embodied by money, and sees the figurines as part of a wider tradition of antisemitic stereotypes in Poland (Jewish sorcerers, Jews taking blood from children, Judensau, Żydokomuna, etc.).

Johnny Daniels, an activist promoting the dialogue between Jews and Poles, said he considers such items an "insensitive but ultimately [a] harmless expression of nostalgia", comparable to the cigar store Indian in the United States. According to the Simon Wiesenthal Center's director for international relations, Shimon Samuels, an underlying superstition regarding Jews lays behind the figurines. Samuels likened them to a phantom limb for modern day Poland. Due to the lack of a sizeable Jewish presence in the country, the figurines therefore serve as a legacy of persistent Jewish caricatures.

=== Impact and use ===
According to Lehrer, some Jews who travel to Poland see the figurines as "inflammatory and shocking, and mostly it gets read in the context of antisemitism". Lehrer says that while one can not understand the figurines with the coin without referring to the history of antisemitic imagery, the figurines are rooted in a long history that is more complex than just antisemitism. According to Lehrer, the folk artists creating the figurines, especially the older ones, treat the figurines with artistic, sensitive treatment. One use of the charms is as tourist keepsakes and tokens of nostalgia or political attempts to connect with the Jewish past, whereas a second use is as a good luck charm bringing prosperity. Lehrer states that the figurines are seen in Polish folk society as innocent and even complimentary towards Jewish people, and that most do not realize such items might be controversial. Lehrer also says that the figurines "embody some bits of historical memory of Jews as seen through their mostly peasant neighbours' eyes – but mixed with myth, sometimes nostalgia, and after the war, occasionally empathy." Lehrer notes that these tourist souvenirs evoke an ambivalent reaction among Jewish tourists; and buyers' reactions range from revulsion to wonder.

Joanna Michlic sees the use of Jews as "good luck charms" as a transformation of a prior negative stereotype of Jewish money-lending into a positive stereotype of a Jewish businessman which Poles should imitate for success. Michlic notes that the items are popular, presented as gifts, and in some circles are a "must [have] item" in private businesses. According to Michlic, this has led to a new group of Polish artists specializing in these artifacts, which create kitschy works to fulfill market demand. Michlic states that placing a positive spin on old antisemitic stereotypes is not unique to Poland, but also takes place in other post-communist eastern European countries such as Romania.

Historian Magdalena Waligórska associates the paintings and sculptures with black magic, seeing them as serving an amulet function in a country now almost devoid of Jews.

Musicologist and Jewish studies scholar Halina Goldberg notes that while the phenomenon may be fascinating from in commercial and ethnographic sense, it "is troubling that the most prevalent Polish image of Jewishness, one that is imprinted on the minds of people who know no other Jews, is that of the traditionally attired Orthodox Jew who has the power to control one's financial fortunes."

== Exhibits and performances ==
The 2013 Souvenir, Talisman, Toy exhibit at the Ethnographic Museum of Kraków, curated by Erica Lehrer, explored the development of Jewish figurines in general and the "Jew with a coin" in particular. The exhibit was subsequently extended and displayed at the Galicia Jewish Museum. The subsequent Lucky Jews / Na szczęście to Żyd book is an extended version of the exhibit catalog, and also contains a collection of letters sent to Polish authorities by Jews around the world who are outraged at the motif.

Concurrent to the 2017 Jewish Culture Festival in Kraków, inaugurating Festivalt site-specific events, a trio of street performers dressed in traditional Orthodox garb sat behind a desk, surrounded by a mock picture frame, and laden with old-style inkwell, accounting ledger and quill pen. Bringing the figurines to life, the performers offered "good fortune" to passersby in exchange for a few coins. One of the performers, Michael Rubenfeld, continued performing in 2018.

In 2019, the Jewish Museum London ran an exhibit titled Jews, Money, Myth exploring antisemitic imagery linking Jews with money. Alongside manifestations of antisemitic imagery dating back to Judas and the thirty pieces of silver, the exhibit featured a display case of the popular Polish "Lucky Jew" ceramic figurines.

== See also ==
- Blackamoor
- Concrete Aboriginal
- Cigar store Indian
- Economic antisemitism
- Happy Merchant
- Jin Chan
- Lawn jockey
- Mammy archetype
- Maneki-neko
