= Jewish Museum London =

Former museum of British Jewish life

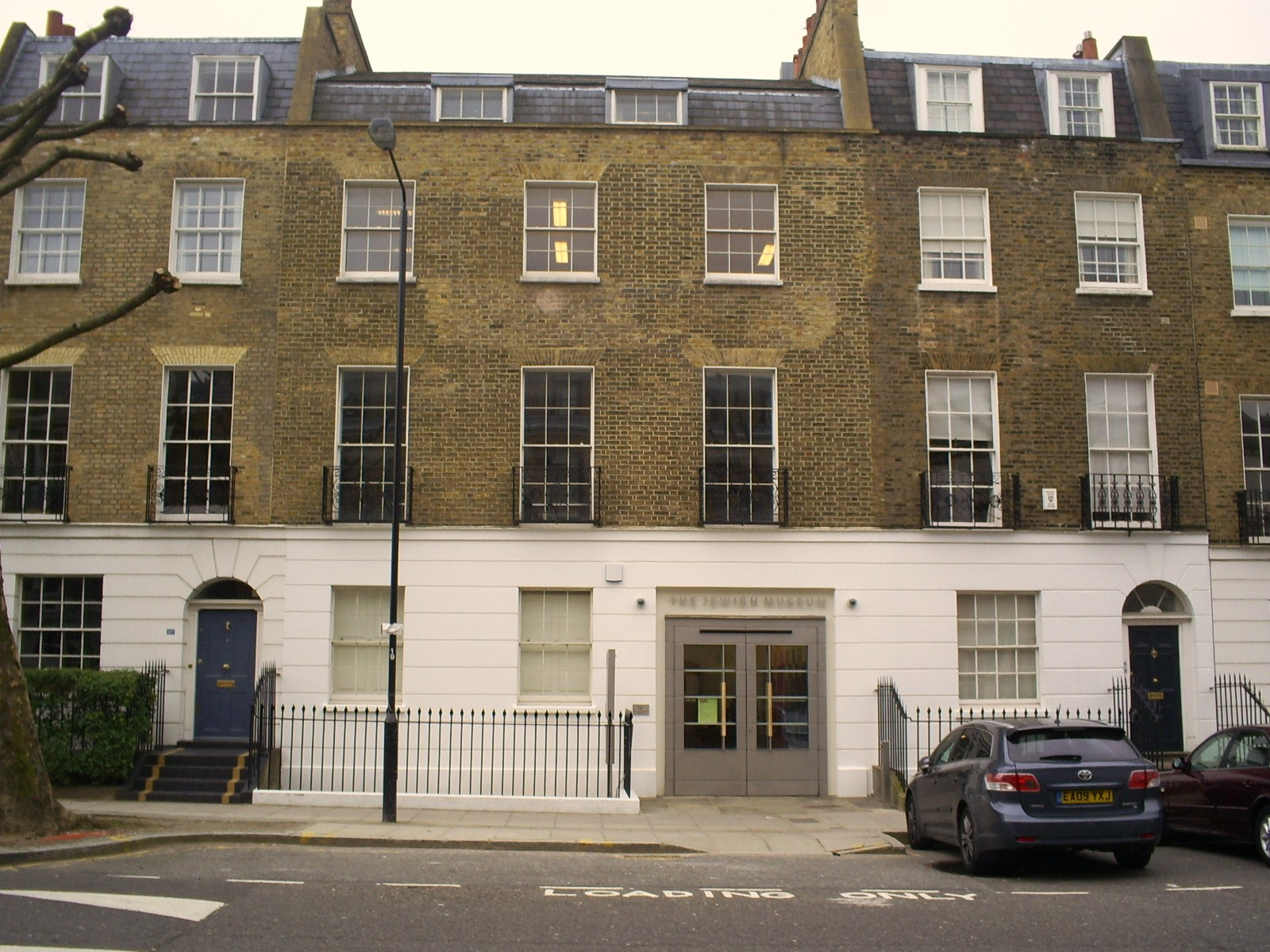
- Exterior of the Jewish Museum at Raymond Burton House

- Location within London Borough of Camden
- Location: Raymond Burton House; 129–131 Albert Street; London, NW1; United Kingdom
- Coordinates: 51°32′13″N 0°08′40″W
- Director: Sue Shave (acting)
- Public transit access: Camden Town
- Website: Jewish Museum London

Listed Building – Grade II
- Official name: Numbers 123–139 and attached railings
- Designated: 14 May 1974
- Reference no.: 1378643

The Jewish Museum London is a museum of British Jewish life, history and identity. It reopened in 2010 after a two-year-long £10 million renovation funded by the Heritage Lottery Fund and other donors. It continues to exist but is currently without permanent premises. The events, programmes and activities at the museum aim to provoke questions, challenge prejudice, and encourage understanding. In June 2026 the British government pledged £1 million of funding to help secure the museum's future.

Until 2023 the museum was situated in Camden Town in the London Borough of Camden, north London. It was a place for people of all faiths to explore Jewish history, culture, and heritage. The museum had a dedicated education team, with a programme for schools, community groups and families. King Charles III is a patron of the museum.

The museum closed during the COVID-19 pandemic in the UK and reopened for two days a week in July 2021, but visitor numbers and income did not recover. The museum closed their Camden site to operate as a Museum without Walls, lending collections to other heritage organisations and leading learning programmes out in the local community, intending to sell the building and move elsewhere taking up to five years to plan and finance the move.

== History ==
The museum, a registered charity, was founded in 1932 in the Jewish communal headquarters in Bloomsbury. In 1995, it moved to its current location in Camden Town. Until 2007 it had a sister museum in Finchley, operated by the same charitable trust and sited within the Sternberg Centre. The Camden branch reopened in 2010 after two years of major building and extension work. The £10 million renovation was funded by the Heritage Lottery Fund and private donations.

The museum was in a row of buildings in Albert Street that have been listed Grade II by Historic England.

== Collections ==
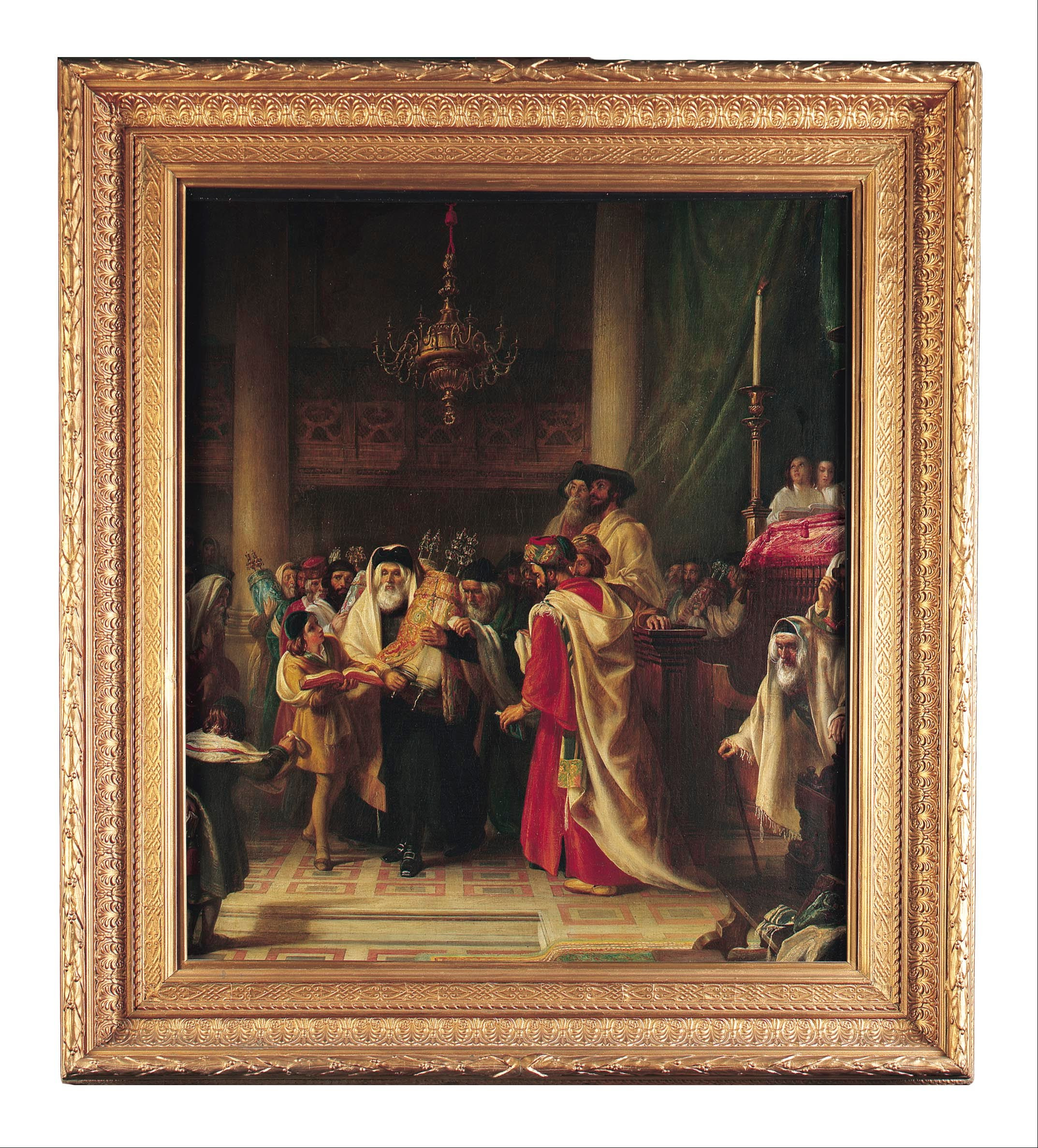
Solomon Hart, Procession of the law, 1845

The museum housed a major international-level collection of Jewish ceremonial art including the Lindo lamp, an early example of a British Hanukkah menorah. The building included a gallery entitled Judaism: A Living Faith, displaying the museum's noted collection of Jewish ceremonial art. This collection had been awarded "designated" status by the Museums, Libraries and Archives Council in recognition of its outstanding national importance. The museum's Holocaust Gallery included items and filmed survivor testimony from Leon Greenman, who was one of the few British subjects to be interned in the death camps section at Auschwitz.

The museum also had exhibitions recounting the history of Jewish life in England, supported by a diverse collection of objects. There were also collections of paintings, prints and drawings, and an archive of photographs, which consisted mainly of black and white photographs from the 1900s to the 1940s, along with militaria from the former Jewish Military Museum, which merged into it in January 2015.

== Exhibitions ==
There were two temporary exhibition spaces. The third floor housed major exhibitions, with smaller exhibitions in the temporary exhibition space on the ground floor.

=== Previous exhibitions ===
- Asterix in Britain: The Life and Work of René Goscinny
- Elsbeth Juda: Grit and Glamour
- Designs on Britain
- Scots Jews: Photographs by Judah Passow
- Shaping Ceramics: From Lucie Rie to Edmund de Waal
- Dorothy Bohm: Sixties London
- Moses, Mods and Mr Fish: The Menswear Revolution
- Through a Queer Lens: Portraits of LGBTQ Jews
- Blood: Uniting & Dividing
- Memory Quilts: Triumph Over Adversity
- Tiger, Mog and Pink Rabbit: a Judith Kerr Retrospective
- Your Jewish Museum: Love, Journeys and Sacrifice
- Blackguards in Bonnets
- For Richer, For Poorer: Weddings Unveiled
- Designing the 20th Century: Life and Work of Abram Games
- For King and Country? The Jewish Experience of the First World War
- Four Four Jew: Football, Fans and Faith
- Amy Winehouse: A Family Portrait
- R.B. Kitaj: Obsessions – The Art of Identity
- Morocco: Photographs by Elias Harrus and Pauline Prior
- Entertaining the Nation: Stars of Music, Stage and Screen
- No Place Like Home
- World City: Refugee Stories
- Ludwig Guttmann: Father of the Paralympic Games
- Adi Nes: The Village
- Roman Vishniac Rediscovered, presented simultaneously at The Photographers' Gallery
- Jews, Money, Myth, exploring antisemitic imagery linking Jews with money. Alongside manifestations of antisemitic imagery dating back to Judas and Thirty pieces of silver, the exhibit featured a display case of the popular Polish "Lucky Jew" figurines.
- Charlotte Salomon: Life? or Theatre?

== See also ==
- History of the Jews in England
- Edgar Samuel
