= Abigail Morris (arts administrator) =

British museum director (born 1964)

Abigail Morris (born 1964) is a British arts administrator and the ex-chief executive of the Jewish Museum London. She is the former artistic director and chief executive of Soho Theatre.

Morris was born and grew up in London. She attended Woodhouse School and then Camden School for Girls. She studied at Sidney Sussex College at the Cambridge University where she founded women's theatre company Trouble and Strife. From 1992 until 2000, she was the artistic director and chief executive of Soho Theatre. Before joining the Jewish Museum London in 2012 she was chief executive of women's refuge Jewish Women's Aid in London and think tank ResponseAbility.

Morris is a board member of the Association of European Jewish Museums.
