= List of carriage museums =

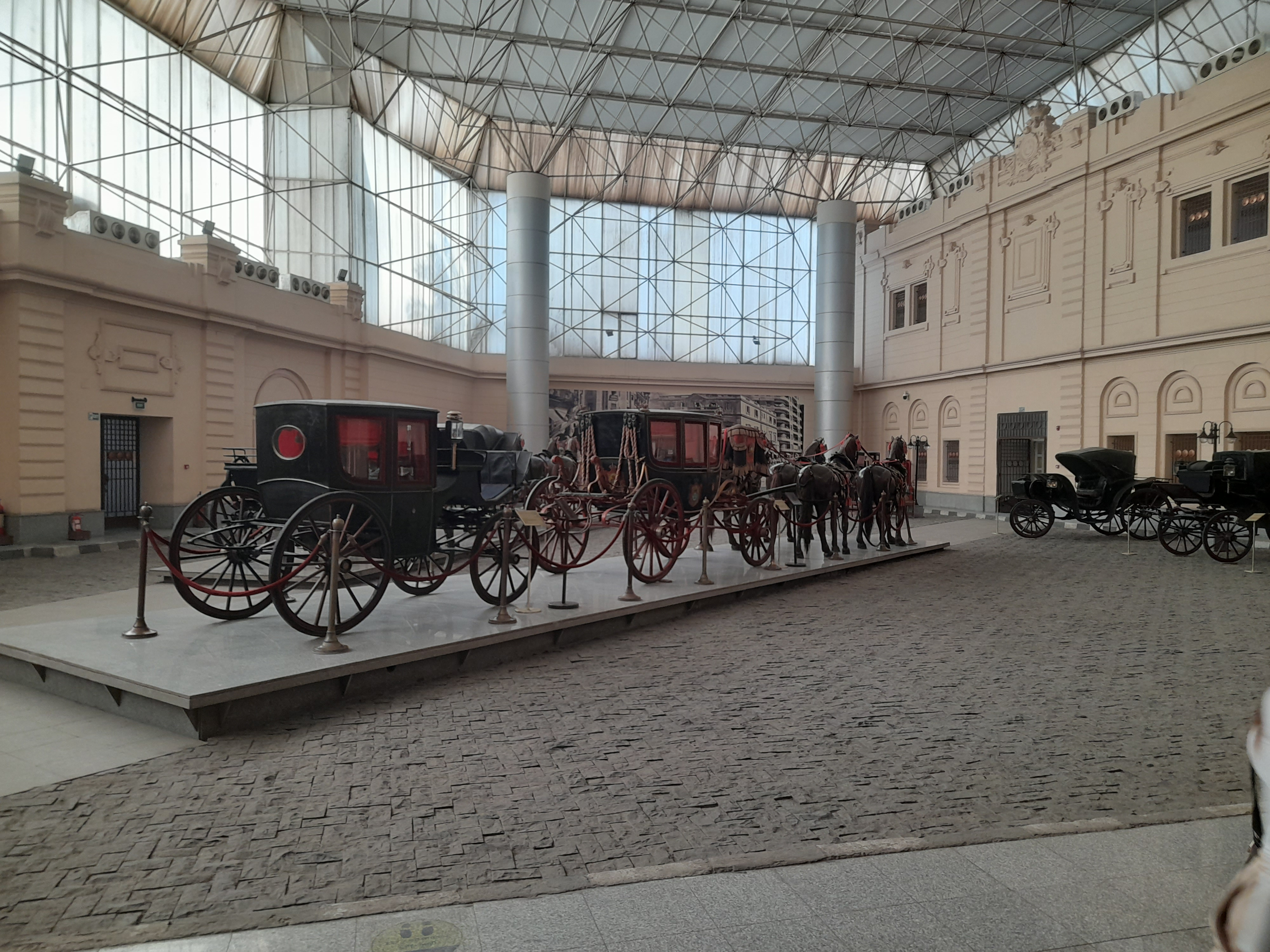
Royal Carriages Museum, Bulaq, Egypt

A carriage museum is a museum that displays carriages, coaches, sleighs, wagons, and other horse-drawn vehicles. Many collections are part of transport museums alongside automobiles and other non-horse-powered transport. Others, especially in Europe, are housed in historic structures such as palaces, royal stables, and historic estates.

== Africa ==
=== Egypt ===
- Royal Carriages Museum in Boulaq, with a smaller satellite display in Cairo Citadel

== Americas ==
=== Argentina ===
- Muhfit (Museo Histórico Fuerte Independencia Tandil), Tandil.

=== Brazil ===
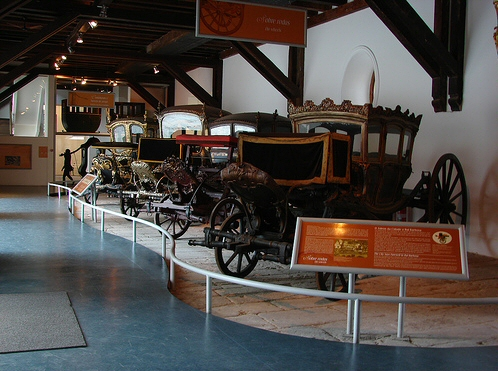
Permanent exhibit featuring carriages of the imperial era at the National Historical Museum of Brazil

- Imperial Museum of Brazil in Petrópolis
- National Historical Museum in Rio de Janeiro

=== Canada ===
- Campbell Carriage Factory Museum in Sackville, New Brunswick
- Kings Landing Historical Settlement in Prince William, New Brunswick has a large collection of horse and oxen drawn vehicles.
- Remington Carriage Museum in Cardston, Alberta

=== United States ===
- Angels Camp Museum in Angels Camp, California
- Carriage and Western Art Museum of Santa Barbara, California
- Carriage Museum of America, Lexington, Kentucky
- Florida Carriage Museum & Resort in Weirsdale, Florida (formerly Austin Carriage Museum)
- Forney Transportation Museum in Denver, Colorado
- Frick Car & Carriage Museum in Pittsburgh, Pennsylvania, preserving carriages owned by Henry Clay Frick and his family
- Genesee Country Village and Museum in Wheatland, New York
- Granger Homestead and Carriage Museum in Canandaigua, New York
- Harness Racing Museum & Hall of Fame in Goshen, New York
- Henry Ford Museum in Dearborn, Michigan
- Horseshoe Barn and Annex at Shelburne Museum in Shelburne, Vermont
- Jeremiah Reeves House and Carriage House in Dover, Ohio

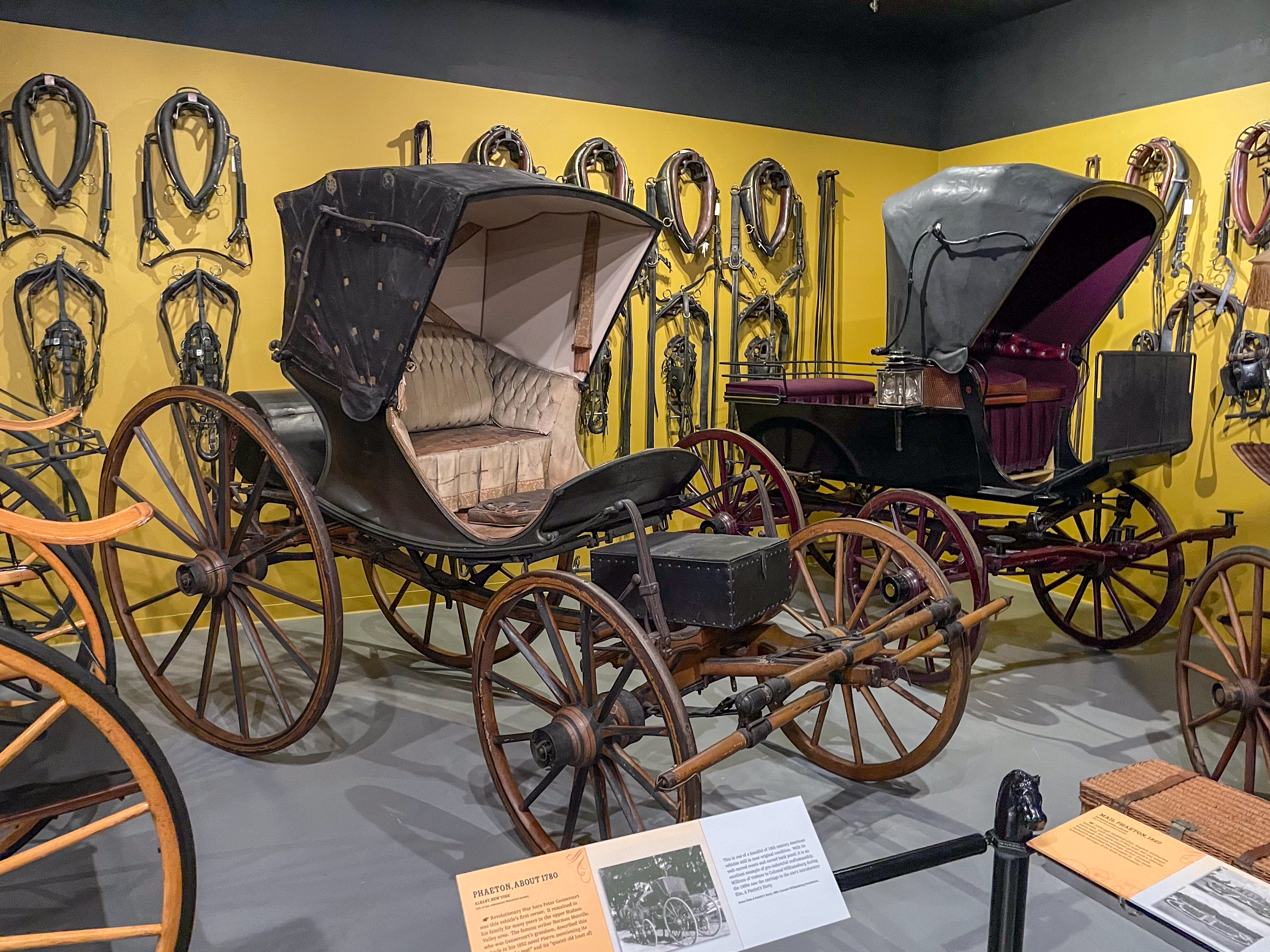
Long Island Museum of American Art, History, and Carriages

- Long Island Museum of American Art, History, and Carriages in Stony Brook, New York
- Maymont in Richmond, Virginia
- Morven Park's Winmill Carriage Museum in Leesburg, Virginia
- Northwest Carriage Museum in Raymond, Washington
- Pioneer Village in Farmington, Utah
- Robert H. Renneberger Carriage Museum in Frederick, Maryland
- Robert Thomas Carriage Museum in Blackstone, Virginia
- Skyline Farm Carriage Museum, North Yarmouth, Maine
- Thrasher Carriage Collection at Allegany Museum in Cumberland, Maryland
- Washington, Kentucky Carriage Museum
- Wesley Jung Carriage Museum on Wade House Historic Site in Greenbush, Wisconsin
- William A. Heiss House and Buggy Shop in Mifflinburg, Pennsylvania; includes 19th century carriage factory

== Asia ==
=== Japan ===
- Japanese Imperial Household Agency, Tokyo

=== Russia ===
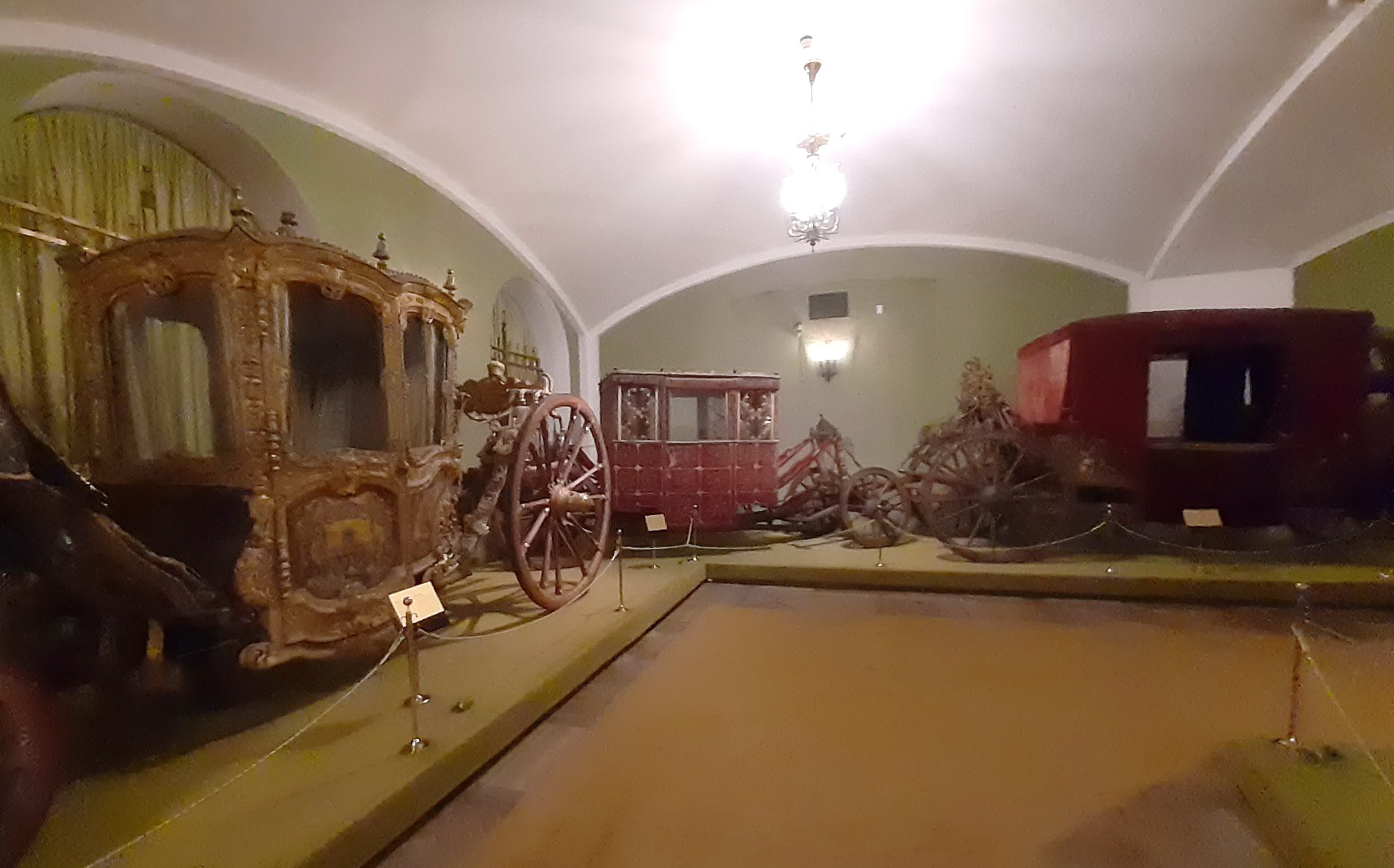
Kremlin Armoury

- Kremlin Armoury, Moscow. The carriage hall has over a dozen original carriages formerly belonging to the Tsars from the 17th and 18th centuries, including several Russian parade carriages of Empresses Anne, Elizabeth and Catherine II, an enclosed sleigh-coach for winter, and a parade carriage made in England that Tsar Boris Godunov received as a gift from King James I of England in 1603. (image gallery)

=== Turkey ===
- Tofaş Museum of Cars and Anatolian Carriages in Bursa

== Europe ==
=== Austria ===
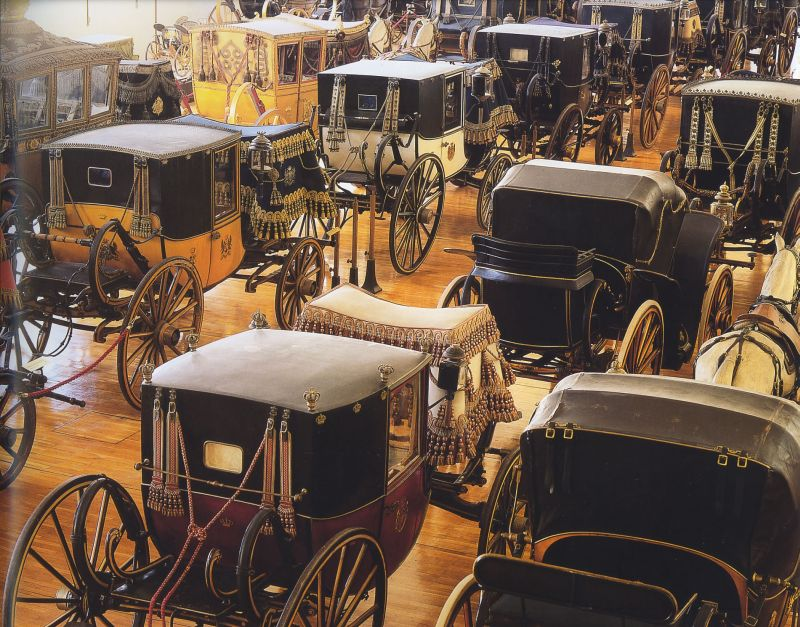
Imperial Carriage Museum

- Imperial Carriage Museum at Schönbrunn Palace in Vienna, includes:
  - Imperial Coach
- Kutschenmuseum in Laa an der Thaya

=== Belgium ===
- Bornem Castle Carriage collection in Bornem
- Carriage Museum Bree in Bree
- De Groom Carriage Center Bruges in Bruges
- Karrenmuseum in Essen
- Koetsen Verdonckt in Maarkedal
- Royal Museum of Art and History in Brussels

=== Denmark ===
- Royal Carriage Museum at Christiansborg Palace in Copenhagen, includes:
  - Golden Coupé
  - Cotillion Coach

=== France ===
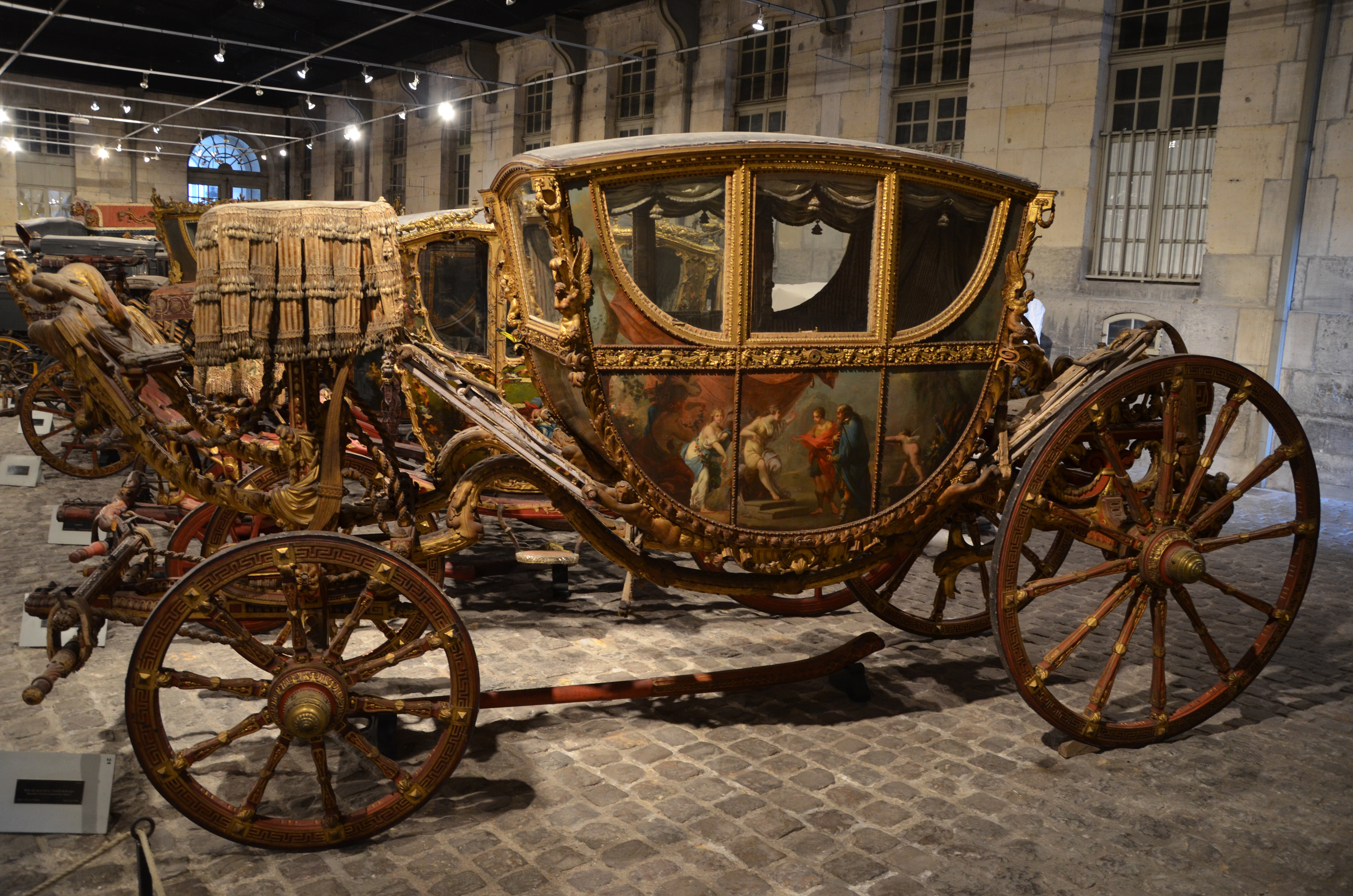
National Car and Tourism Museum at Compiègne

- Château d'Apremont-sur-Allier has a carriage museum in the coach house building
- Château de Chambord, carriage room of the Count of Chambord in Chambord in Loir-et-Cher
- Château Lanessan, carriage museum and stables, Cussac-Fort-Médoc
- Galerie des Carrosses at Grande Écurie in Versailles, includes the Coronation Coach of Charles X
- Haras National de Lamballe in Brittany
- Haras national du Pin in Normandy
- Musée Au temps des calèches in Bourg, Guyenne
- Musée Au temps jadis in Saint-Auvent
- Musée de la voiture à cheval in Les Epesses
- Musée de la voiture à cheval in Marcigny, Burgundy
- Musée de l'attelage et du cheval in Sérignan
- Musée de l'Attelage et du corbillard Yvan Quercy in Cazes-Mondenard
- Musée de l'hippomobile André Clament, Le Fleix
- Musée des Equipages in Château de Vaux-le-Vicomte
- Musée du cheval de trait in Sacy-le-Grand
- Musée du conservatoire breton de la voiture hippomobile in Plouay, Brittany
- National Car and Tourism Museum at Château de Compiègne in Compiègne

=== Germany ===
- Hesse Museum of Carriages and Sleighs in Lohfelden near Kassel
- Marstallmuseum of Carriages and Sleighs in the former Royal Stables, Nymphenburg Palace, Munich
- Romano-Germanic Museum in Cologne
- Schlossmuseum Sondershausen in Sondershausen, Thuringia

=== Italy ===
- Collection at CastelBrando near Cison di Valmarino
- Museo "Le Carrozze d'Epoca", Rome
- Museo Civico delle Carrozze d'Epoca di Codroipo
- Museo Civico delle Carrozze d'Epoca, San Martino, Udine
- Museo della Carrozze in Palazzo Buonaccorsi in Macerata
- Museo delle Carrozze del Quirinale, Rome
- Museum of Coaches at Palazzo Farnese, Piacenza
- Carriage exhibit of the Grand Ducal court at Palazzo Pitti in Florence
- Museo delle Carrozze, Catanzaro
- Carriage collection at Villa Barbaro in Maser, Veneto
- Carriage collection at Villa Pignatelli in Naples
- Vatican Historical Museum – Carriage Pavilion (Padiglione delle Carrozze), Vatican City (located within Rome)

=== Netherlands ===
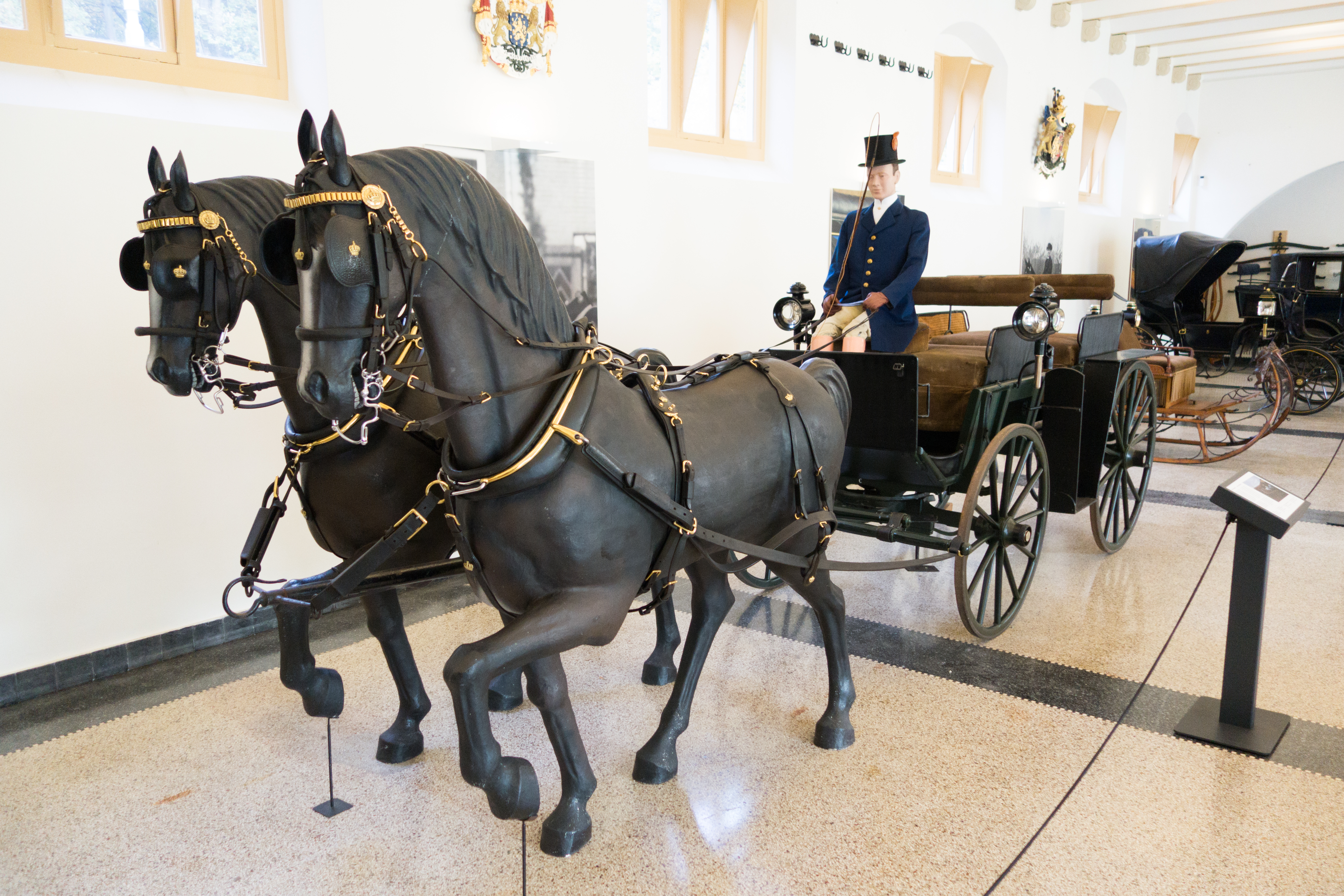
Royal Stables, Het Loo Palace

- Royal Stables, includes:
  - Glass Coach
  - Golden Coach
- Het Loo Palace, Apeldoorn
- Nationaal Rijtuigmuseum, Leek

=== Poland ===
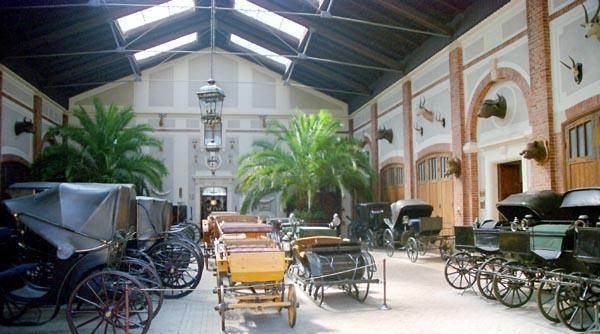
Exhibit of carriages in Łańcut Castle, Poland

- Kozłówka Palace in Kozłówka
- Łańcut Castle in Łańcut Images
- Pałac w Rogalinie in Rogalin

=== Portugal ===
- Geraz do Lima Carriage museum in Viana do Castelo
- National Coach Museum (Museu Nacional dos Coches) in Lisbon

=== Spain ===
- Carriage Museum (Seville), Seville
- Igualada Muleteer's Museum in Igualada
- Royal Collections Gallery in Madrid

=== Sweden ===
- Ulriksdal Palace in Edsviken

=== Switzerland ===
- Basel Historical Museum in Basel

=== United Kingdom ===
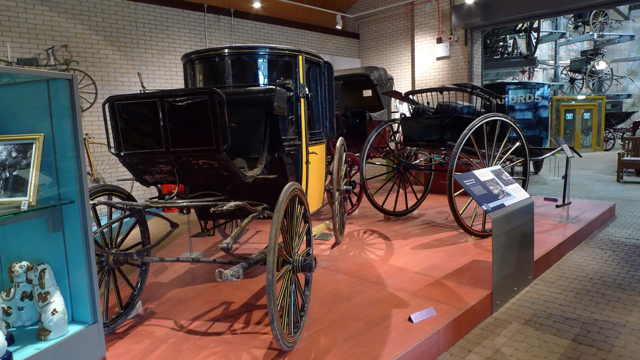
Carriages in the Mossman collection

- Alnwick Castle in Alnwick, Northumberland
- Arlington Court & The National Trust's Carriage Collection in Arlington, Devon
- Balmoral Castle in Aberdeenshire, Scotland
- Gordon Boswell Romany Museum in Spalding, Lincolnshire
- Mossman Carriage Collection in Luton, Bedfordshire

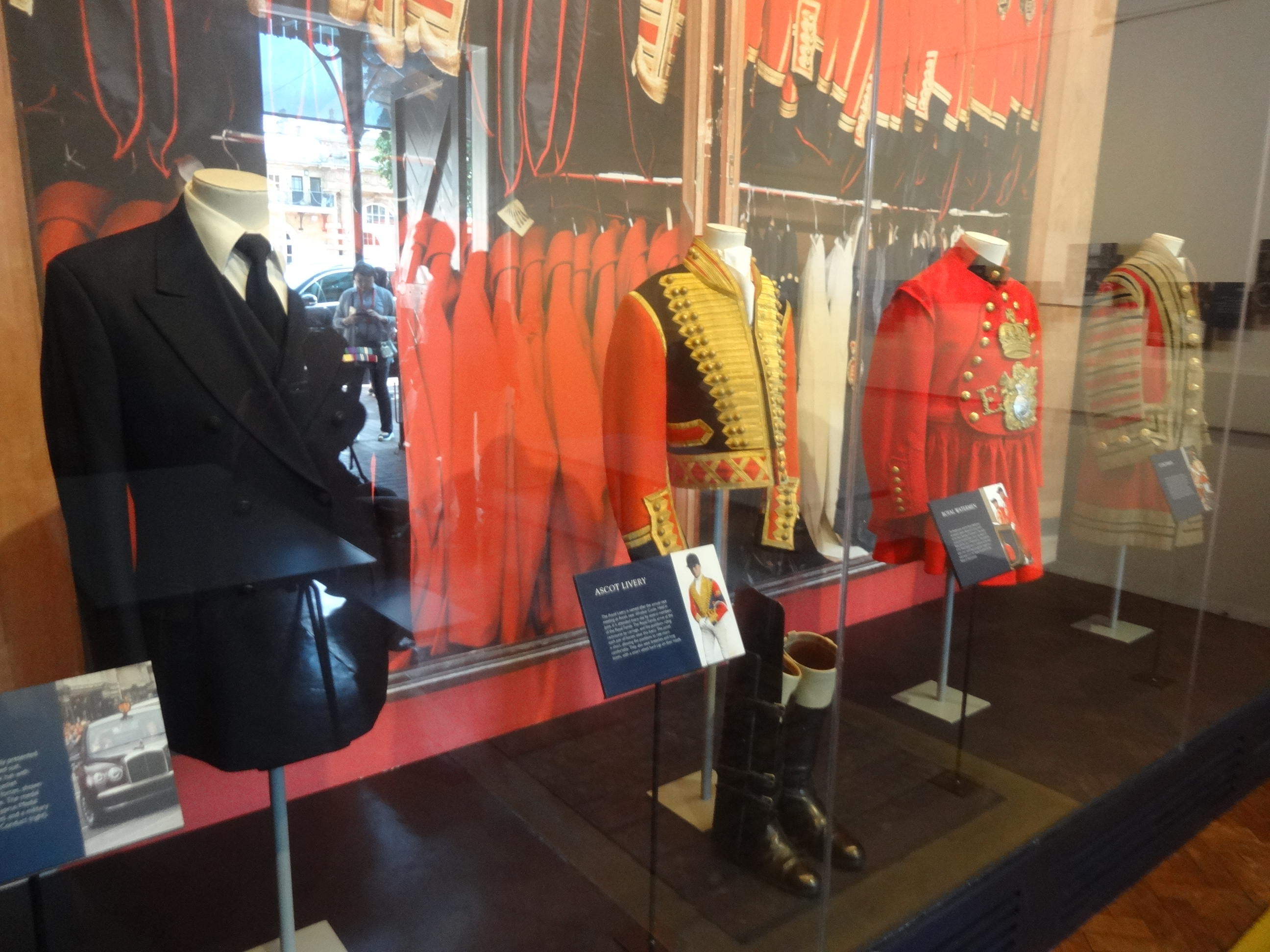
Livery uniforms at the Royal Mews

- Royal Mews § Royal and state carriages at Buckingham Palace in London, includes:
  - 1902 State Landau
  - Australian State Coach
  - Diamond Jubilee State Coach
  - Glass Coach
  - Gold State Coach
  - Irish State Coach
  - King Edward VII's Town Coach
  - Queen Alexandra's State Coach
  - Scottish State Coach
- Sandringham House in Sandringham, Norfolk
- Swingletree Carriage Collection of John Parker in Diss, Norfolk
- Tyrwhitt-Drake Museum of Carriages in Maidstone, Kent

== Oceania ==
=== Australia ===
- Queensland Museum Cobb+Co – National Carriage Collection, Queensland Museum, Toowoomba, Queensland.
- National Trust of Australia (Victoria) Carriage Collection

=== New Zealand ===
- Yaldhurst Museum in Christchurch
