= Carriage Museum =

Carriage Museum may refer to:

- Carriage Museum (Egypt), a museum in Cairo, Egypt
- Florida Carriage Museum & Resort, in Florida
- Geraz do Lima Carriage Museum, a museum in Geraz do Lima, Portugal
- Remington Carriage Museum, a museum in Cardston, Alberta, Canada
- Tofaş Museum of Cars and Anatolian Carriages, a museum in Bursa, Turkey
- Wesley W. Jung Carriage Museum, in Wisconsin
- National Coach Museum, a museum in Lisbon, Portugal

== See also ==
- Category:Carriage museums
