= Pierce-Racine (automobile) =

Defunct American motor vehicle manufacturer

Pierce Engine Company Pierce Motor Company
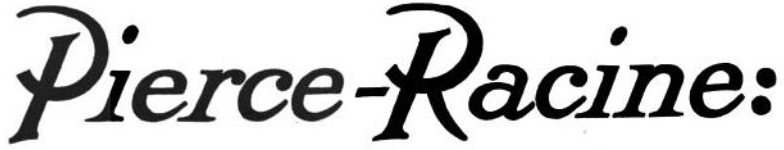
- Company type: Automobile Manufacturing
- Industry: Automotive
- Founded: 1904; 122 years ago
- Founder: Andrew J. Pierce
- Defunct: 1910; 116 years ago
- Fate: Purchased by J. I. Case Company
- Headquarters: Racine, Wisconsin, United States
- Area served: United States
- Products: Automobiles
- Production output: 2,211 (1904-1910)

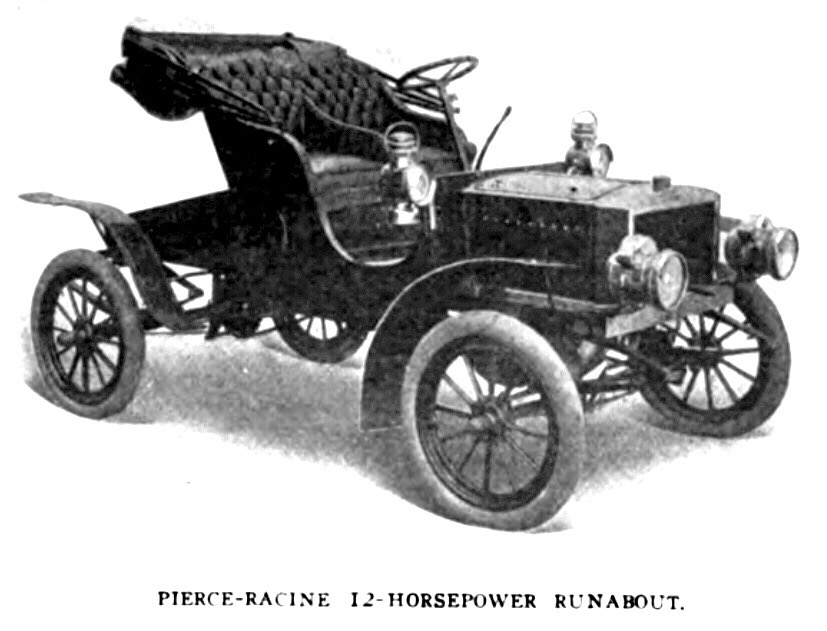
Pierce-Racine Model A-3 (1906)

The Pierce Engine Company of Racine, Wisconsin, was the manufacturer of the brass era Pierce-Racine automobile. The company was founded in 1892 and produced automobiles from 1904 to 1910.

== History ==
Andrew J. Pierce arrived in Racine, Wisconsin in 1887, and by 1892 he had organized the Racine Gas Engine Company, which then became the Pierce Gas Engine Company located at 1952 Clark Street. Stationary and marine engines were the company’s primary products, Pierce also produced to order lake launches to be powered by their marine engines. In 1895 Pierce began experimenting with horseless carriages by motorizing a surrey. He continued experimenting over the next several years, until in 1903 a small two-seat runabout was produced in series for Mitchell Motor Car Company across town.

The runabout was equipped with a one-cylinder engine with 8-hp (5.9 kW). The following year, Pierce entered automobile production selling the runabout as a Pierce-Racine. In 1905 Pierce added two-cylinder cars and a four-cylinder car were added in 1906.

By March 1906, the company had four models including:

- Model A-3, a 12-horsepower, 2-cylinder Runabout priced at $750, equivalent to $26,875 in 2025;
- Model A-4, a 14-horsepower, 2-cylinder Light Touring Car priced at $850;
- Model B2, a 16-horsepower, 2-cylinder Light Touring Car priced at $1,150;
- Model C, a 24-horsepower, 4-cylinder Touring Car priced at $1,750, equivalent to $62,708 in 2025.

New York agents were Gantert & Paul at 60-62 West 116th Street and New England agents were Butler Motor Car Company of 995 Boylston Street in Boston.

Beginning in 1907 Pierce-Racine's were sold as a single Model D 40hp automobile priced at $2,600. Model D would be improved as the Model E, G and H up to 1909, now with a 45-hp engine, priced at $2,000, equivalent to $71,667 in 2025. In 1909 the Pierce Engine Company was reorganized with J. I. Case Company investors as the Pierce Motor Company. On August 4, 1910, Pierce Motor Company was absorbed by the J. I. Case Threshing Machine Company and the Pierce-Racine became the Case automobile. Case automobiles were produced until 1927.

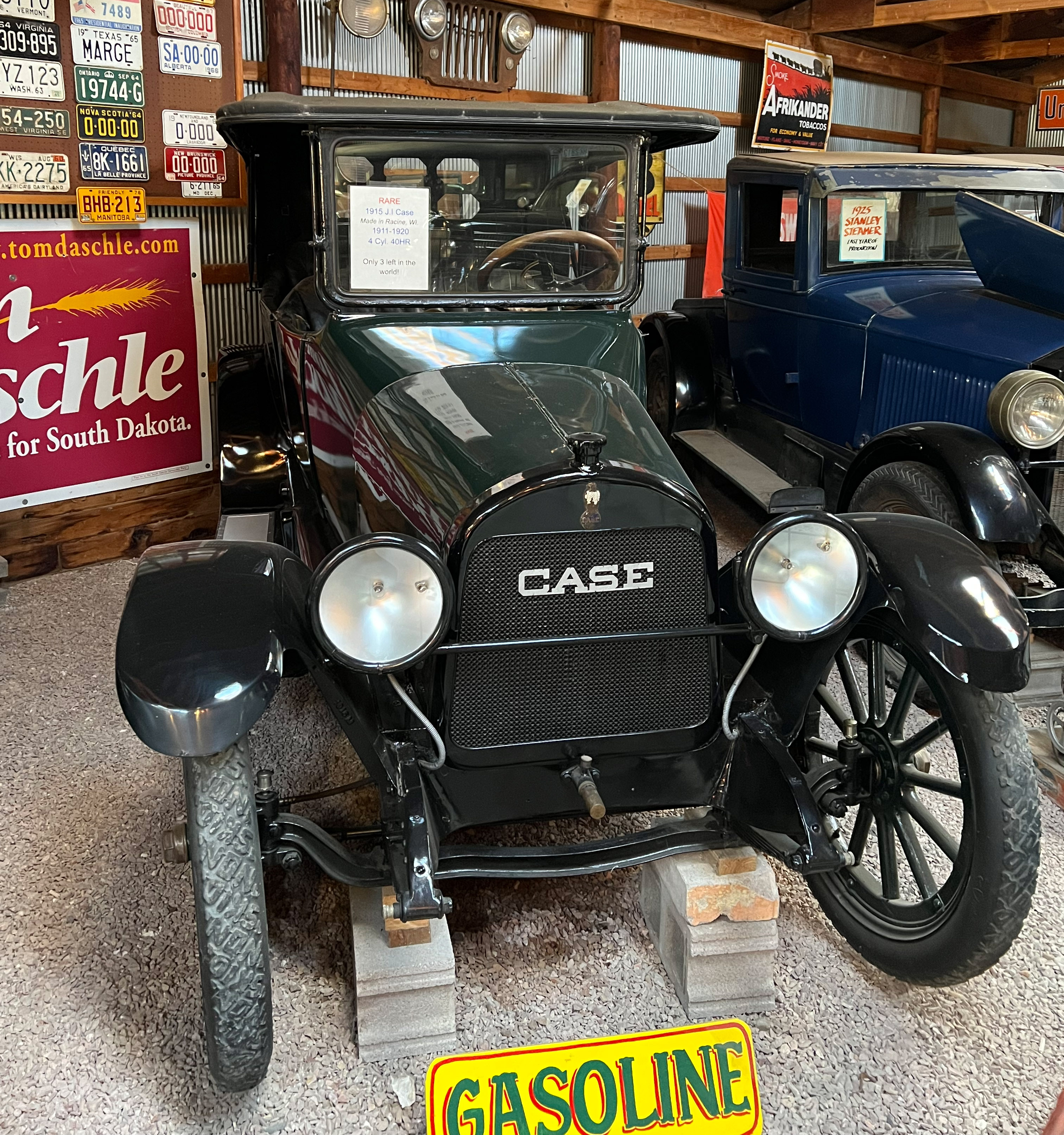
1915 J.I. Case automobile on display at the Pioneer Auto Museum, Murdo, South Dakota.

== Advertisements ==
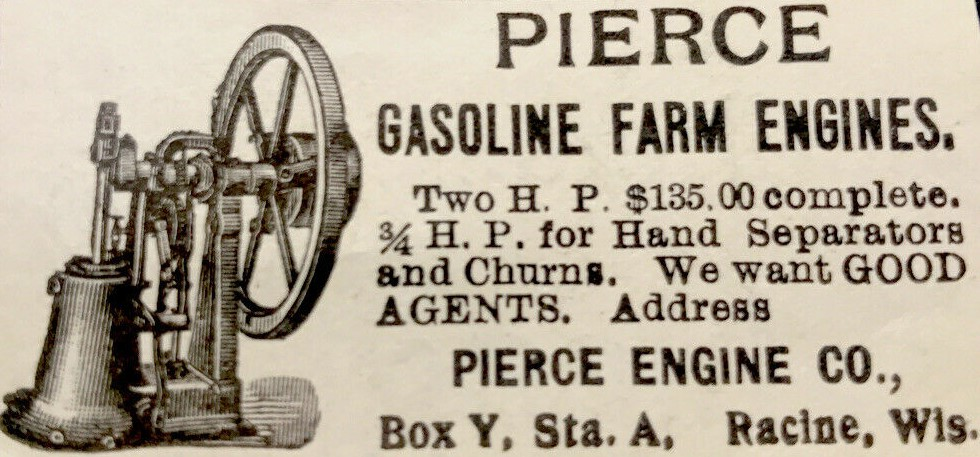
1897 Pierce stationary gas engines advertisement

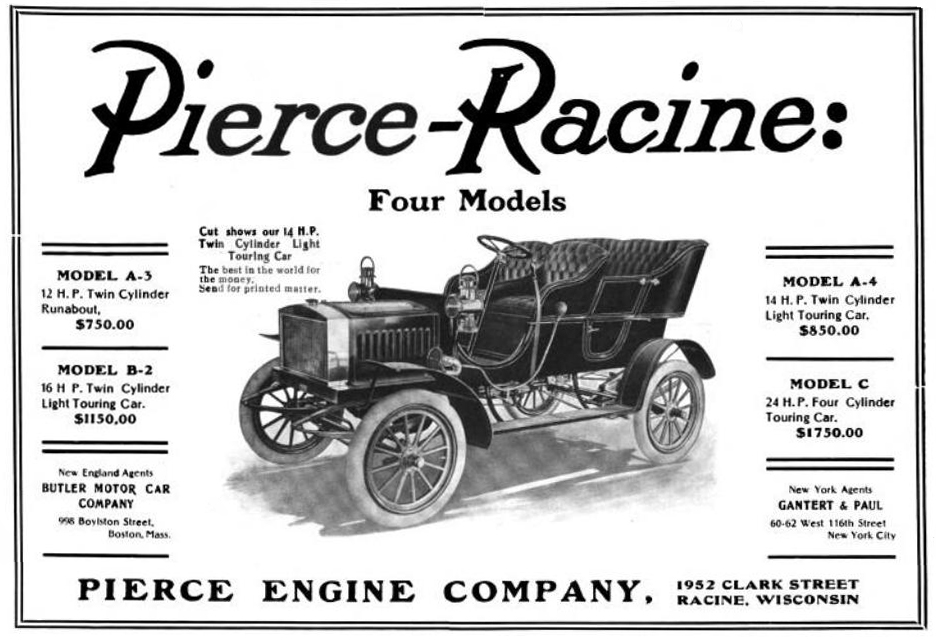
1906 Pierce-Racine advertisement in Motor magazine

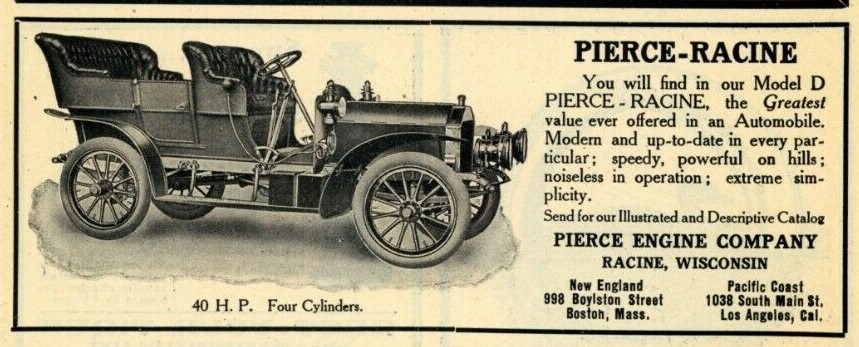
1907 Pierce-Racine Model D advertisement in Cycle and Automobile Trade Journal

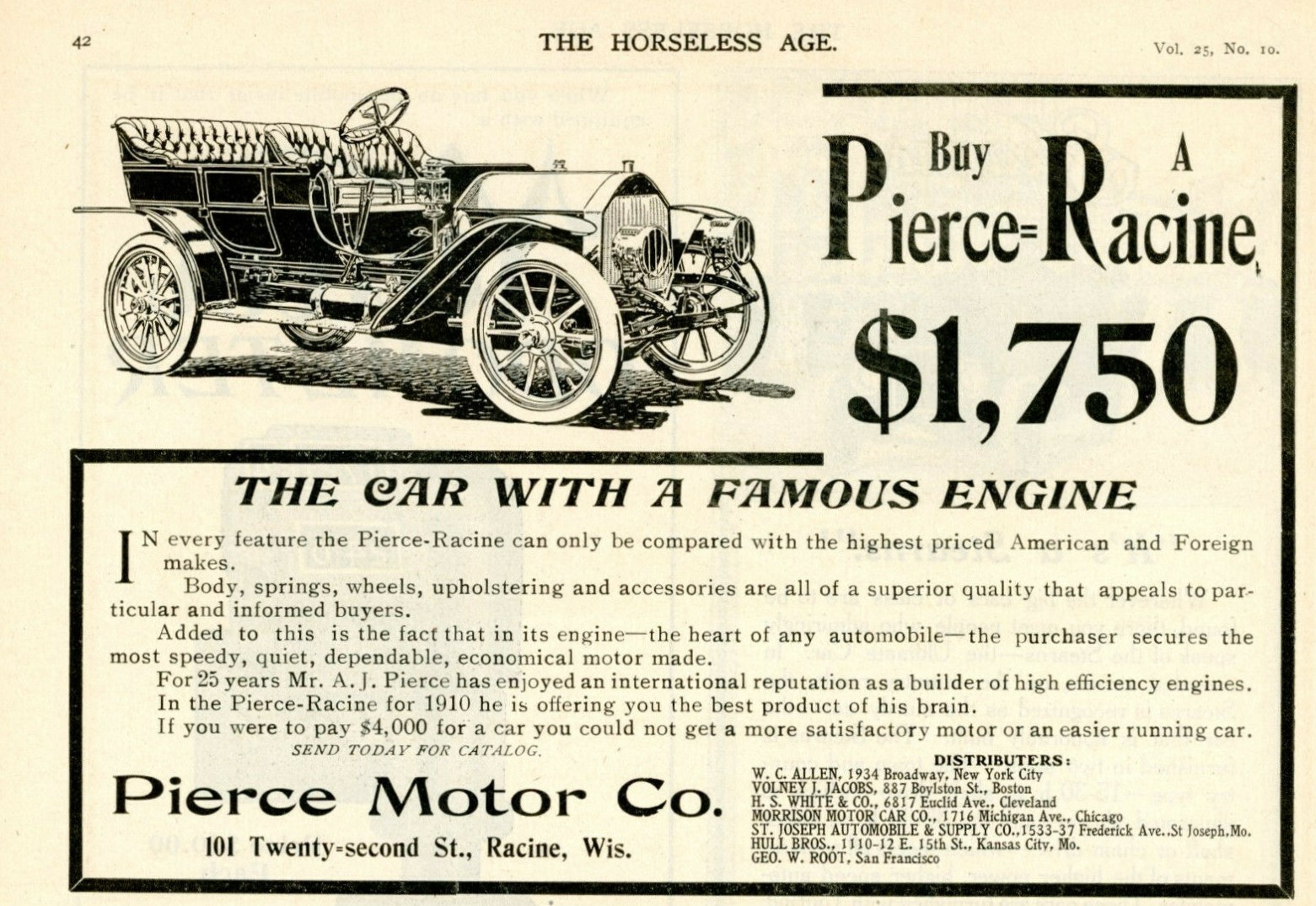
1910 Pierce-Racine advertisement in Horseless Age

== See also ==
- Stahl Automobile Museum - 1906 Pierce-Racine Model D
- 1906 Pierce-Racine Model D at ConceptCarz
- Racine County Eye article - Pierce Gas Engine Company
- Detroit Public Library images of Pierce-Racines
