= Horseshoe Barn and Annex =

Exhibit building at Shelburne Museum in Vermont

Coordinates: 44°22′40.68″N 73°13′51.56″W

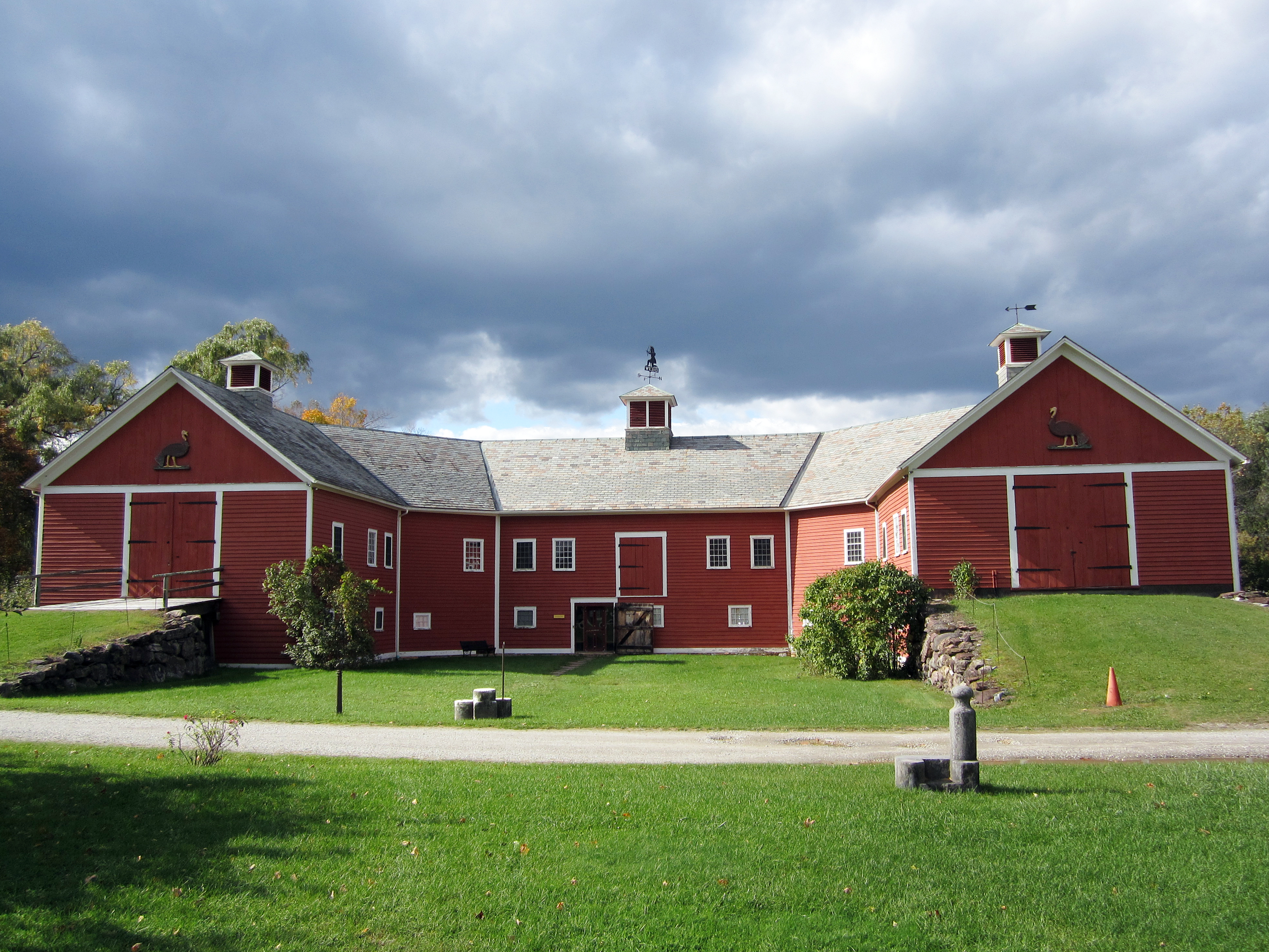
Exterior of the Horseshoe Barn located at the Shelburne Museum.

The Horseshoe Barn and Horseshoe Barn Annex are two exhibit buildings located at Shelburne Museum in Shelburne, Vermont. Both buildings exhibit a variety of horse-drawn vehicles, including carriages, trade wagons, stagecoaches, and sleighs.

== History ==
Electra Havemeyer Webb's desire to provide a suitable setting for the carriage collection of her father-in-law, Dr. William Seward Webb, provided the inspiration for founding Shelburne Museum. She searched Vermont for a building to house these fine carriages and found a unique horseshoe-shaped dairy barn near the town of Georgia. When the owner declined to sell the barn, Electra Webb directed her staff to create a copy of the structure. Over a two-year period they located, moved, and assembled hand-hewn beams from twelve Vermont barns and stone from two gristmills to construct their own horseshoe barn on museum grounds.

Completed in July 1949, the massive structure, which is 238.5 feet (72.7 m) long and 32 feet (9.8 m) wide, incorporated 745 timbers, posts, and braces, 17,000 feet (5,200 m) of plank and other boarding, and 9,000 square feet (840 m^{2}) of slate. Carpenters specially cut new clapboards for the exterior siding with an up-and-down saw to recreate the markings found on the original building.

In 1957, after the addition of 150 more vehicles to the transportation collection, the museum constructed the Horseshoe Barn Annex to exhibit key examples from the collection using a combination of old and new materials.

== Horseshoe barns ==
It appears that there are very few horseshoe-shaped barns in the United States. Of the two documented horseshoe barns in Vermont, only one still stands today. The Shelburne Museum houses the only remaining horseshoe barn in Vermont; the Georgia, Vermont barn it was modeled after was torn down shortly after. There is still a road named Horseshoe Barn Road in Georgia, Vermont.

Other known horseshoe-shaped barns are:

- Llangollen Farm in Virginia

== Carriage collection ==
The museum's carriage collection began with the vehicles owned by Dr. William Seward Webb and his wife Lila Vanderbilt Webb. Today it has come to include 225 horse-drawn vehicles. Since many of these vehicles came straight from their respective owners, many still retain their original upholstery and decoration.

=== Horsedrawn vehicles ===
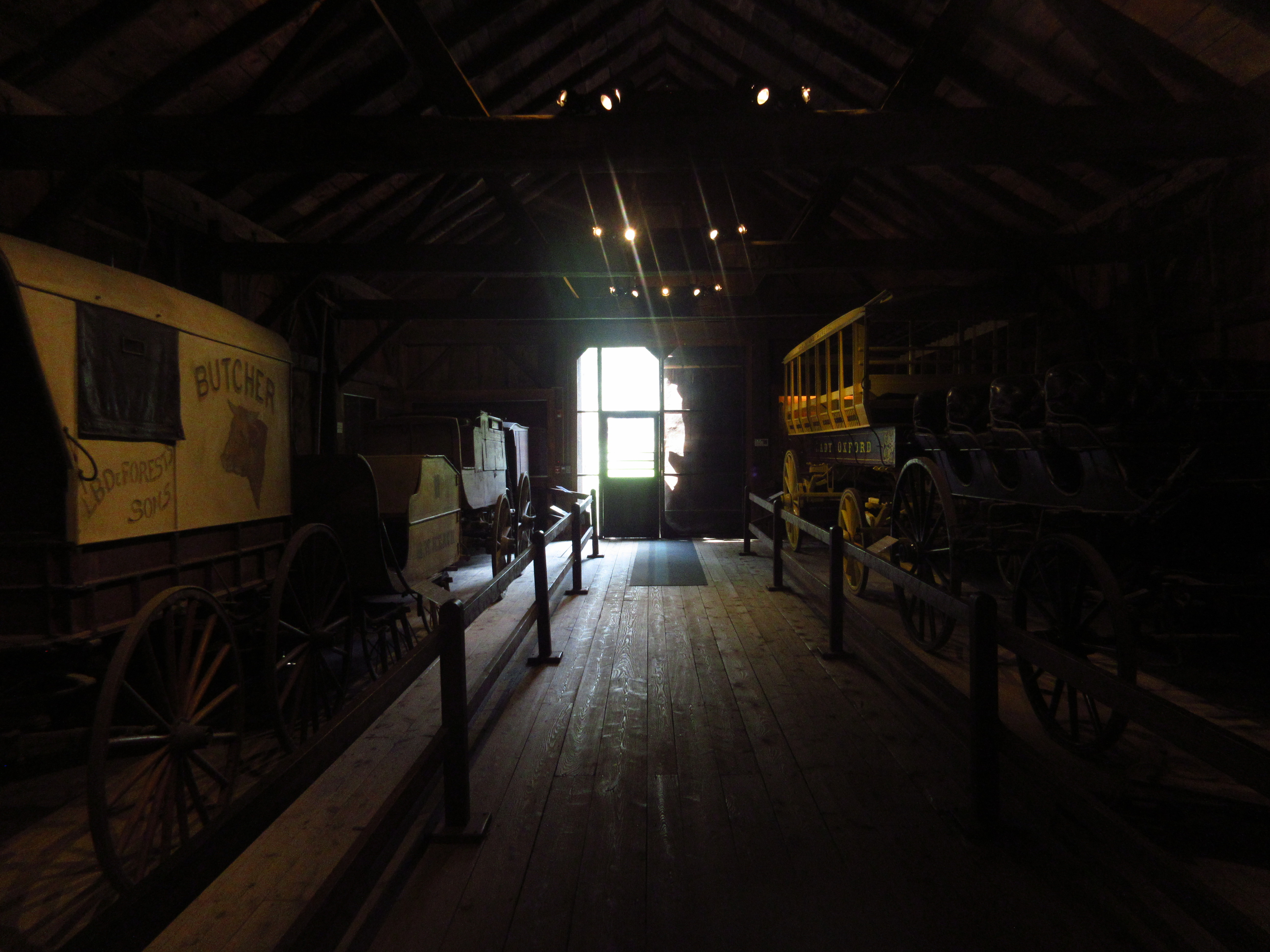
Horsedrawn vehicles in the building

Carriages and coaches began to be widely used in Britain during the 17th century. However, real progress in carriage building was not made until the late 18th century, when Royal Mail coach service began. For the first time, many carriages were designed for comfort and speed and were made alike, using interchangeable parts. Soon carriage driving became the fashionable way to travel, although for many years the cost of vehicles restricted their use primarily to the nobility and upper classes.

The manufacture of horse-drawn vehicles advanced more quickly in 19th-century America, where vehicles quickly became available to people of every social class. By the late 19th century, American coach builders had developed light and practical vehicles that were available to the general public at low prices through mail order houses such as Sears and Roebuck. An elegant runabout made by Brewster & Co., America's finest coach builder, cost $425 in 1900; a runabout sold by Sears was $24.95.

Shelburne Museum's collection of horse-drawn vehicles includes examples of 19th and early 20th century carriages, farm and trade wagons, stagecoaches, sleighs, early firefighting equipment, and almost every other type of vehicle used in New England in the 19th century. One of the most comprehensive collections in the country, it is particularly important because most of the vehicles retain their original upholstery, lamps, and decorative finishes.

Many of the museum's finest vehicles originally belonged to Dr. William Seward Webb, father-in-law of Electra Havemeyer Webb, including a number of elegant carriages and coaches by New York's Brewster & Co. and a remarkable pair of custom-made vehicles – a caleche and a satin-trimmed Berlin – by Million et Guiet of Paris.

Rural Americans were often too busy to travel during the warm months, when farm chores kept them close to home. Winter brought more leisure time. Snow could be packed down with horse-drawn rollers to form a far smoother surface than was available on dirt roads at other times of the year. Sleighs were much easier to build and repair than wheeled vehicles; a home craftsperson without specialized training could construct and maintain them. For these reasons, the typical northern farm family owned three sleighs for every wheeled vehicle it kept.

Sleighs echoed wheeled vehicles in form. Some wheeled vehicles, like the museum's hearse, could be converted from wheels to runners as the seasons changed. The museum's sleighs range from small and simple homemade wooden cutters to elaborate, multi-passenger surreys, caleches, and victorias. The collection also includes a stage sleigh, a school bus sleigh, a butcher's delivery sleigh and a police ambulance and paddy wagon sleigh.

Multi-passenger stagecoaches and omnibuses provided public transportation for travelers within and between cities, from train stations to hotels, and on sightseeing trips. Businesses transported goods by horse, often using wagons and sleighs that advertised their wares with decorative pictures and signage. Commercial vehicles in the museum's collection include a Concord stagecoach used to transport hotel guests in the White Mountains, a butcher's wagon complete with hanging scales and meat hooks, a Maine druggist's patent medicine wagon and a Pennsylvania Conestoga wagon, used to haul produce from rural farms to city markets.

Vehicles were also essential to firefighters, who needed to transport water and equipment quickly. A variety of early firefighting vehicles are represented in the museum's collection. The horse was a latecomer to firefighting, not pressed widely into service until the 1870s. To save precious time, horses were kept in the firehouse. Their stalls had break-away chains and, at the sound of the alarm, the horses raced to their places in front of the waiting equipment. Their collars and harnesses were suspended from the ceiling, poised like spiders in a web, ready to drop at a touch.

The steam-driven pumper, the hose wagon, and the hook-and-ladder truck became the three major horse-drawn firefighting vehicles. However, it was the steamer, usually driven with horses harnessed two or three abreast, that provided the most spectacular sight as it flew down the street with smoke pouring from the funnel of its boiler, building up a head of steam to run the pumps.

== See also ==
- Liz Whitney Tippett (Llangollen estate)
