= Jeremiah Reeves House and Carriage House =

Historic house in Ohio, United States

- Jeremiah E. Reeves Home and Carriage House Museum
- U.S. National Register of Historic Places
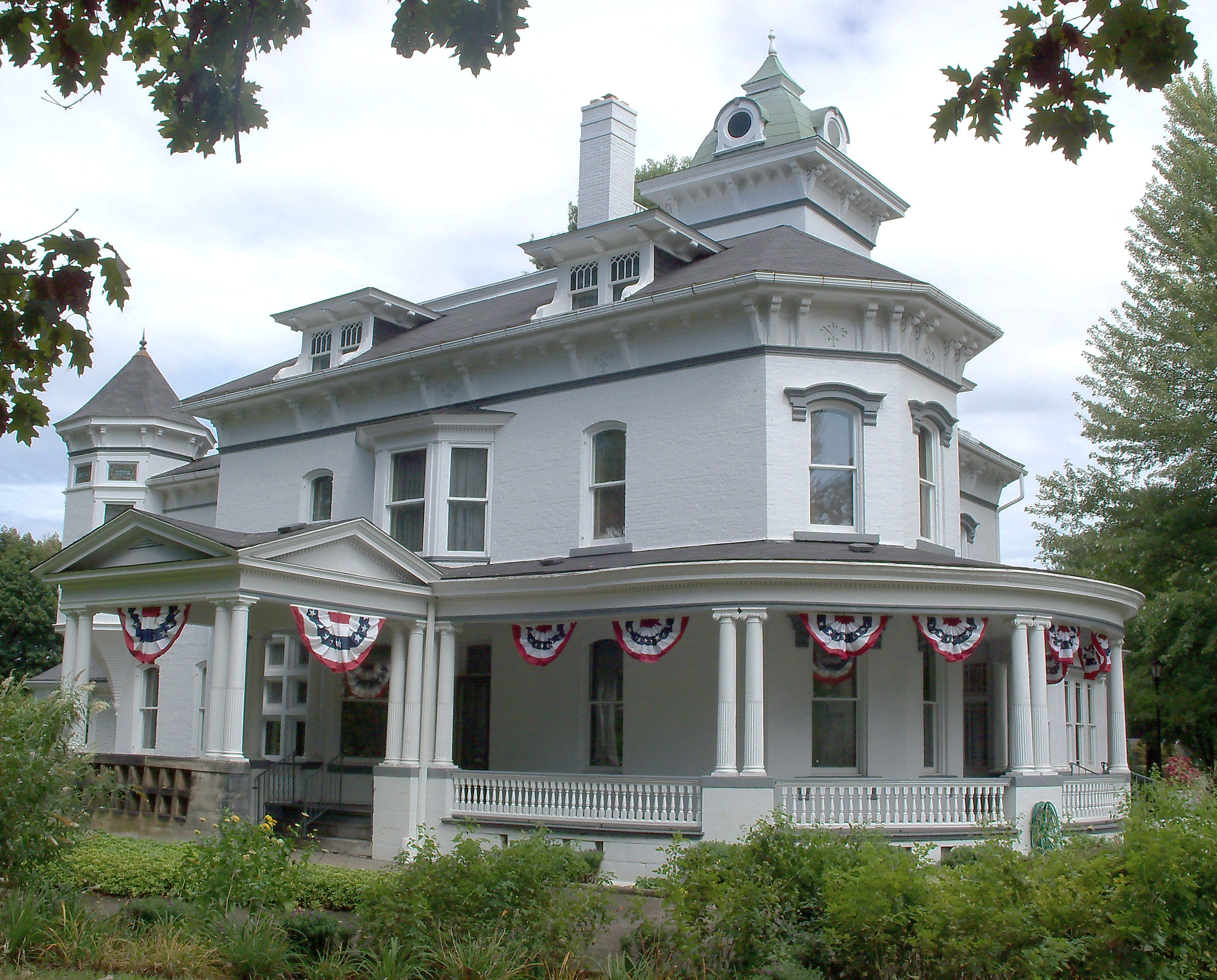

- Location within Ohio Location within the United States
- Location: 325 E. Iron Ave., Dover, Ohio
- Coordinates: 40°30′57″N 81°27′46″W
- Area: 1.9 acres (0.77 ha)
- Built: 1870
- Architectural style: Second Empire, Italianate, Queen Anne
- NRHP reference No.: 82003661
- Added to NRHP: July 15, 1982

The Jeremiah E. Reeves Home and Carriage House Museum is located at 325 East Iron Avenue in Dover, Tuscarawas County, Ohio. The house is also alternatively known as the Dover Historical Society and the J.E. Reeves Victorian Home and Carriage House Museum. The property was listed on the National Register on 1982-07-15.

== History ==
The house was built in 1870 by Valentine Wills as a two-story farmhouse. The brick house had large spacious rooms with high ceilings. Jeremiah E. Reeves, an industrialist and banker, purchased the house and surrounding 400 acres in 1898. After a three year renovation, the house was transformed into a 17-room Italianate mansion, equipped with a ballroom, drawing room, and a large dining room, to name a few. The Reeves family moved into the home in 1901.

Jeremiah Reeves died in the house in 1920, and the house remained occupied until the death of his wife, Jane, in 1926. The house was vacant save for a few times of sporadic inhabitation by the Reeves family and underwent a "modernization" in the 1940s. The Dover Historical Society (DHS) was gifted the house and property by Samuel Reeves Jr. and other family members. The DHS restored the home with the help of Samuel Reeves, Jr.

The property is maintained today as a museum by the DHS and showcases life during the Victorian Era.
