= Surrey (carriage) =

American horse-drawn carriage

Surrey

A surrey, also called a surrey wagon, is an American four-wheeled family or passenger carriage. It usually seats four people on two forward-facing seats and is drawn by one or two horses.

== Design and variations ==
Early surreys were built with a shallow tray body, in the manner of the American buggy, and mounted on transverse elliptic springs. They were entered in the front with the left seat folding up to give access to the rear seat. The design was later modified to add an access point between the front and rear wheels with a low step and large fenders. While some surreys were built without any top at all, a wide variety of tops appeared, including falling half-hoods, umbrella tops, extension tops, canopy tops supported on iron standards, and the fringed canopy that became popular in the 1880s.

Variations of surreys

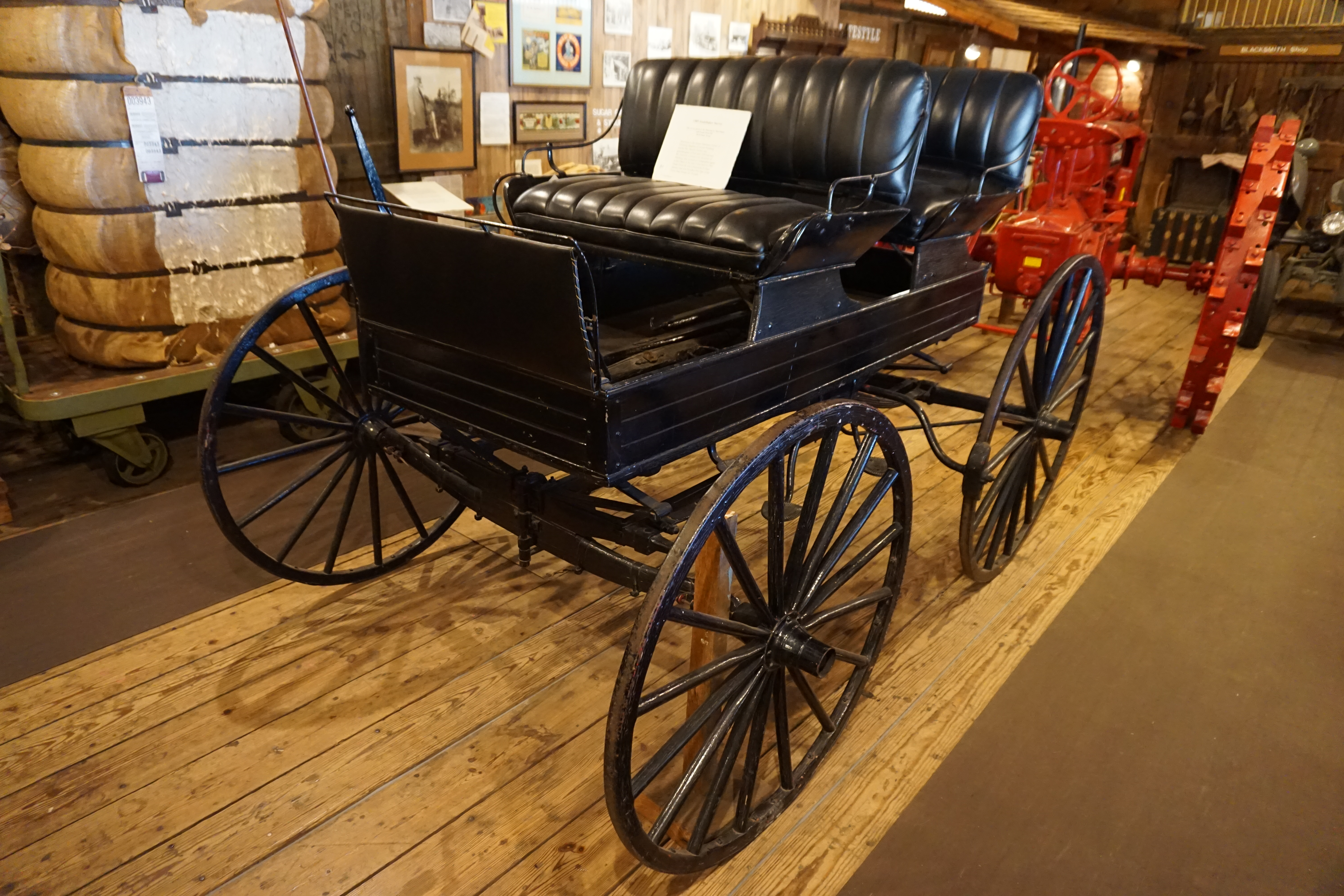
Open-top tray-body, 1909

6-seater with canopy top

Extension-top surrey showing side access step

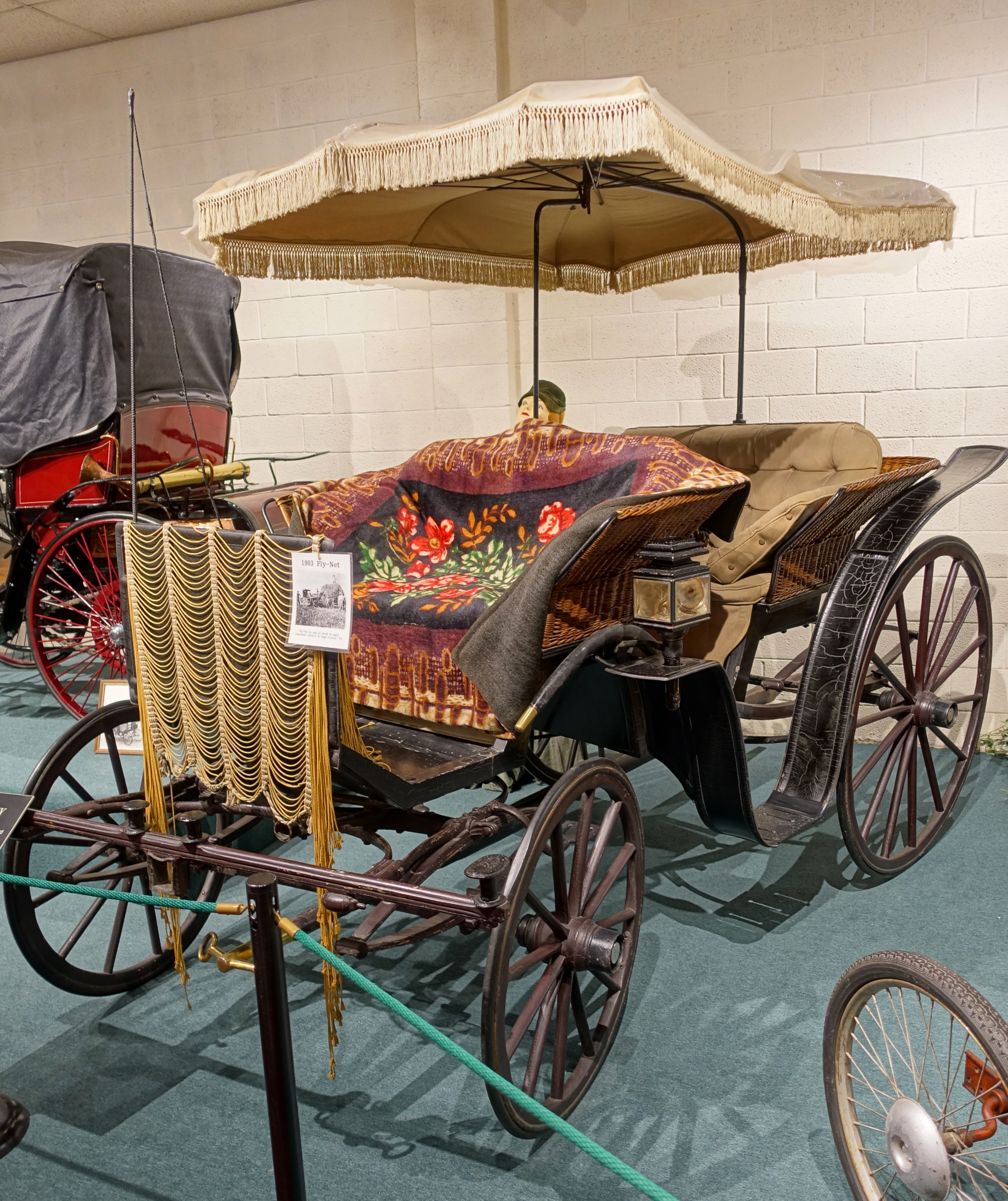
Umbrella-canopy

Modern surrey for tourist trade

== Modern usage ==
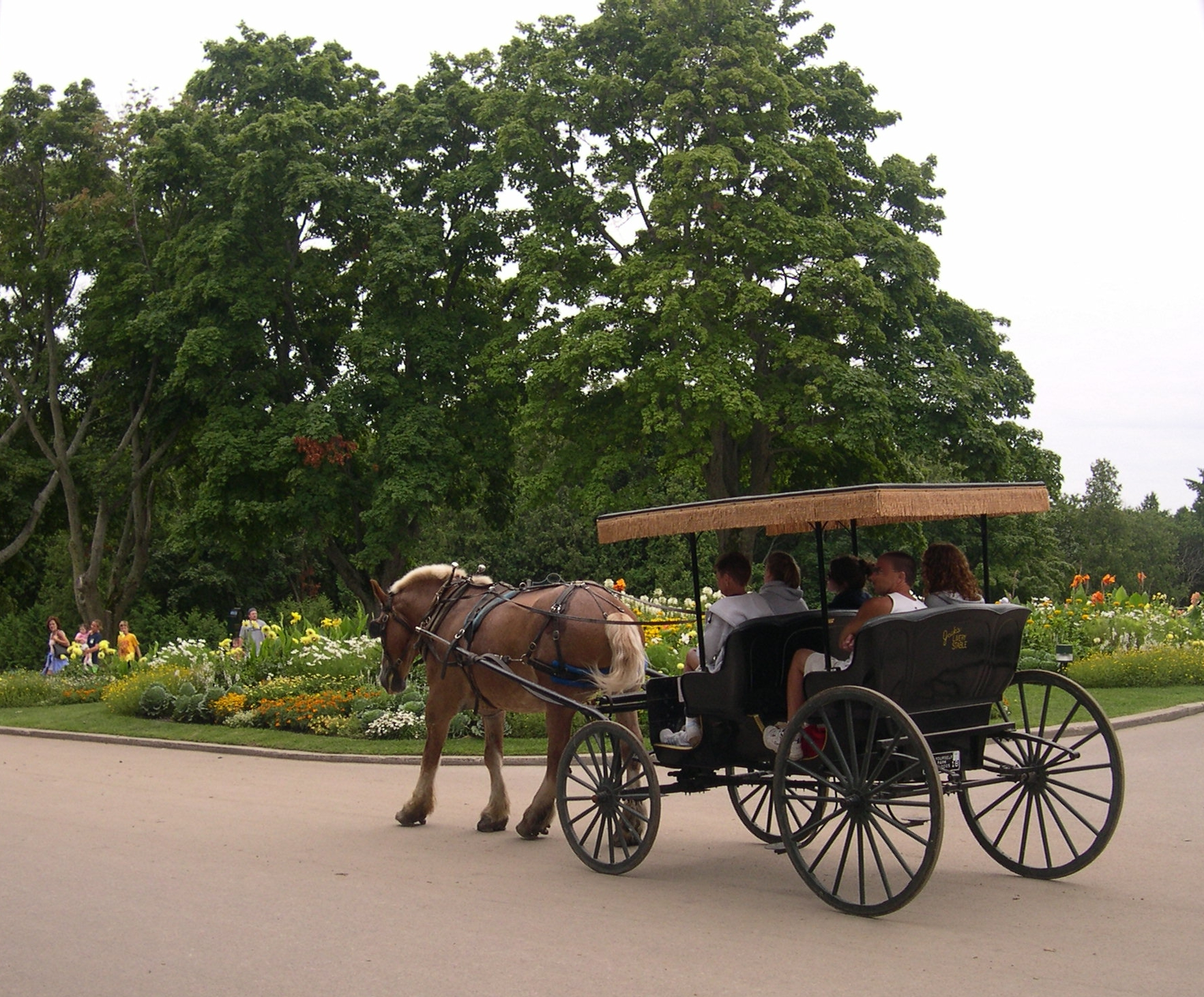
Surrey travel on Mackinac Island

Surreys are still in use on Mackinac Island where motor vehicles are restricted. Many surreys are on display in carriage museums. The American surrey was celebrated in the song "The Surrey with the Fringe on Top" from the 1943 musical Oklahoma!.

== See also ==
- Carriage
- Horse-drawn vehicle
