= Carriage Museum (Egypt) =

Museum in Cairo, Egypt

Coordinates: 30.055914088398364°N 31.23130089093144°E

Royal Carriages Museum
- متحف المركبات الملكية
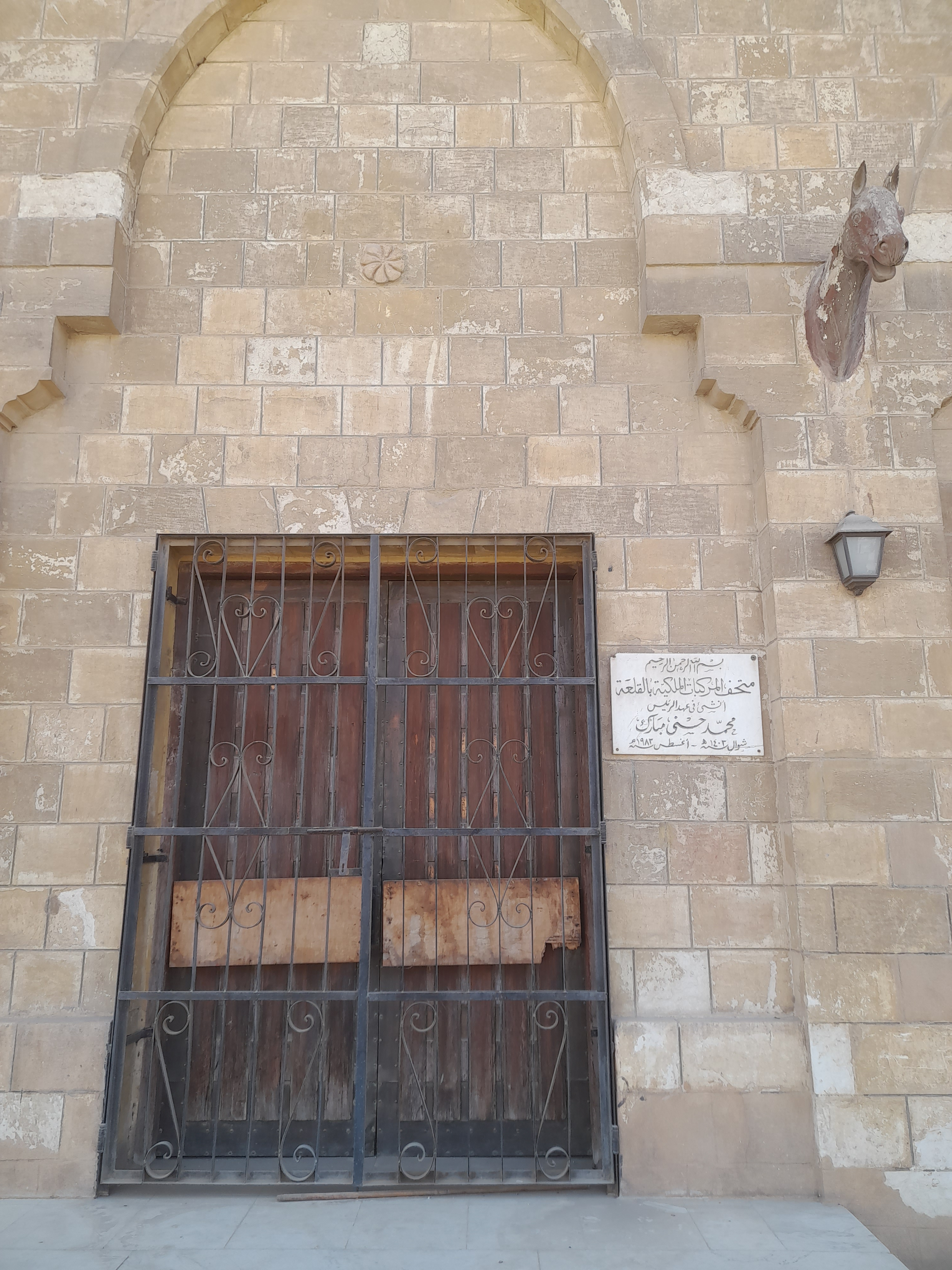
- Entrance to the Royal Carriages Museum
- Established: 1983
- Location: Cairo Citadel, Cairo, Egypt
- Type: Carriage museum

The Royal Carriages Museum (Arabic: متحف المركبات الملكية) is located within the walls of the Cairo Citadel, in front of Suleiman Pasha Mosque. It is currently closed, and its contents have been relocated to the newer and larger Royal Carriages Museum in Bulaq.

== History ==
The Royal Carriages Museum was inaugurated in 1983 and was re-inaugurated after its renovation in 2013. The museum is currently closed.

== Collection ==
The museum houses a collection of royal carriages attributed to different historical periods, from the reign of Khedive Ismail until the reign of King Farouk, in addition to other antiques related to the carriages.

== Gallery ==
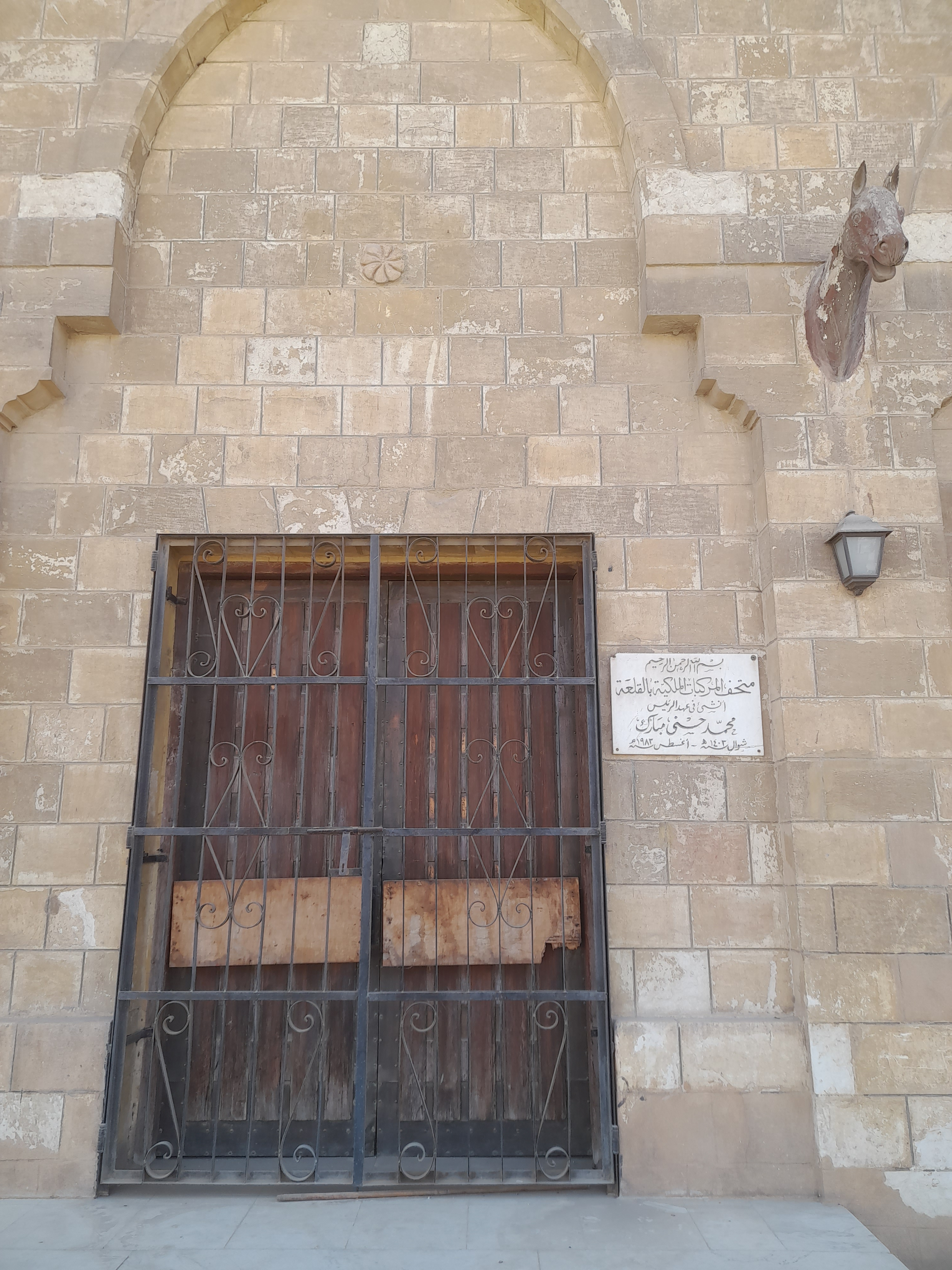
Entrance gate of the Royal Carriages Museum

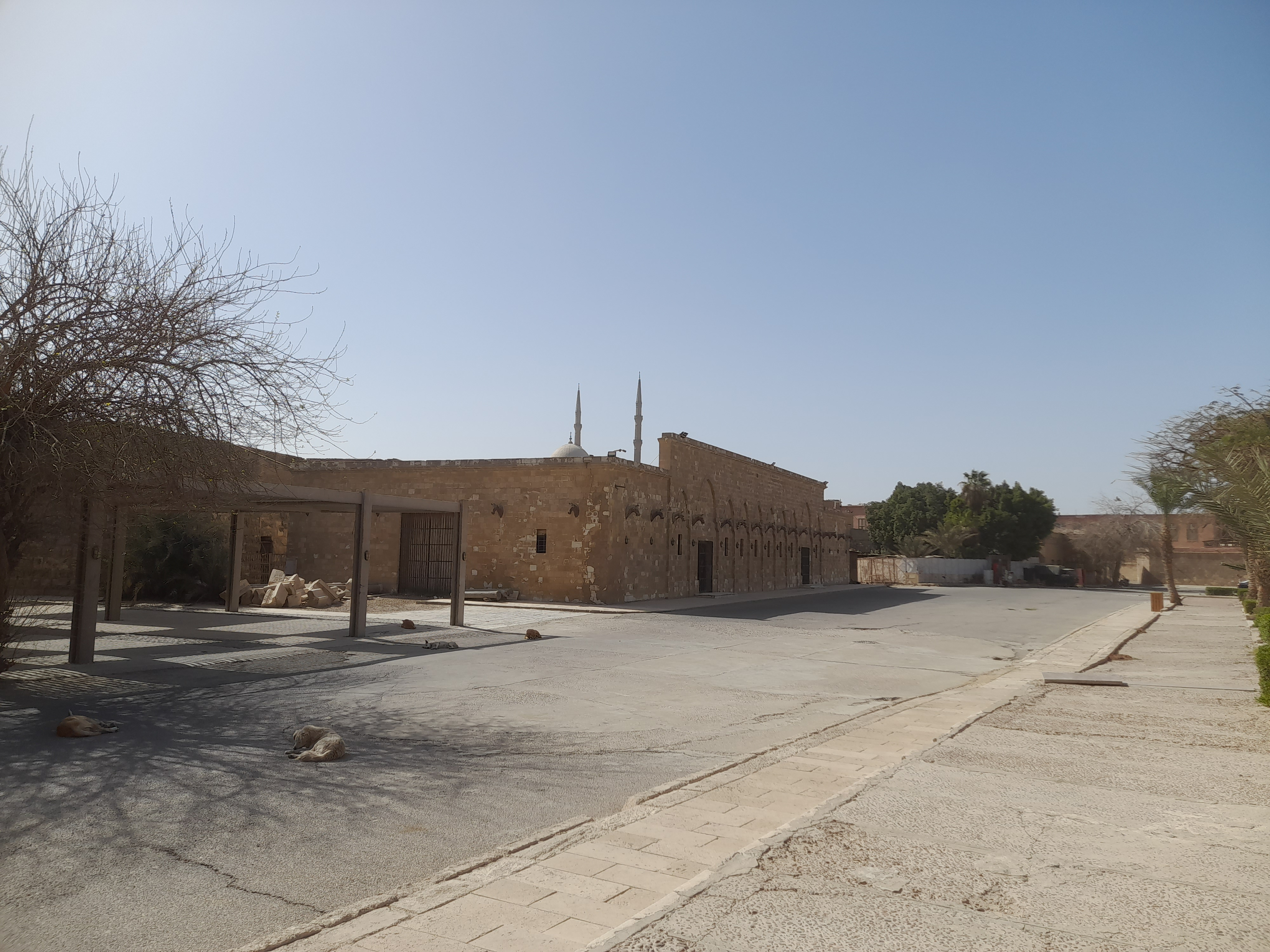
Exterior view of the museum

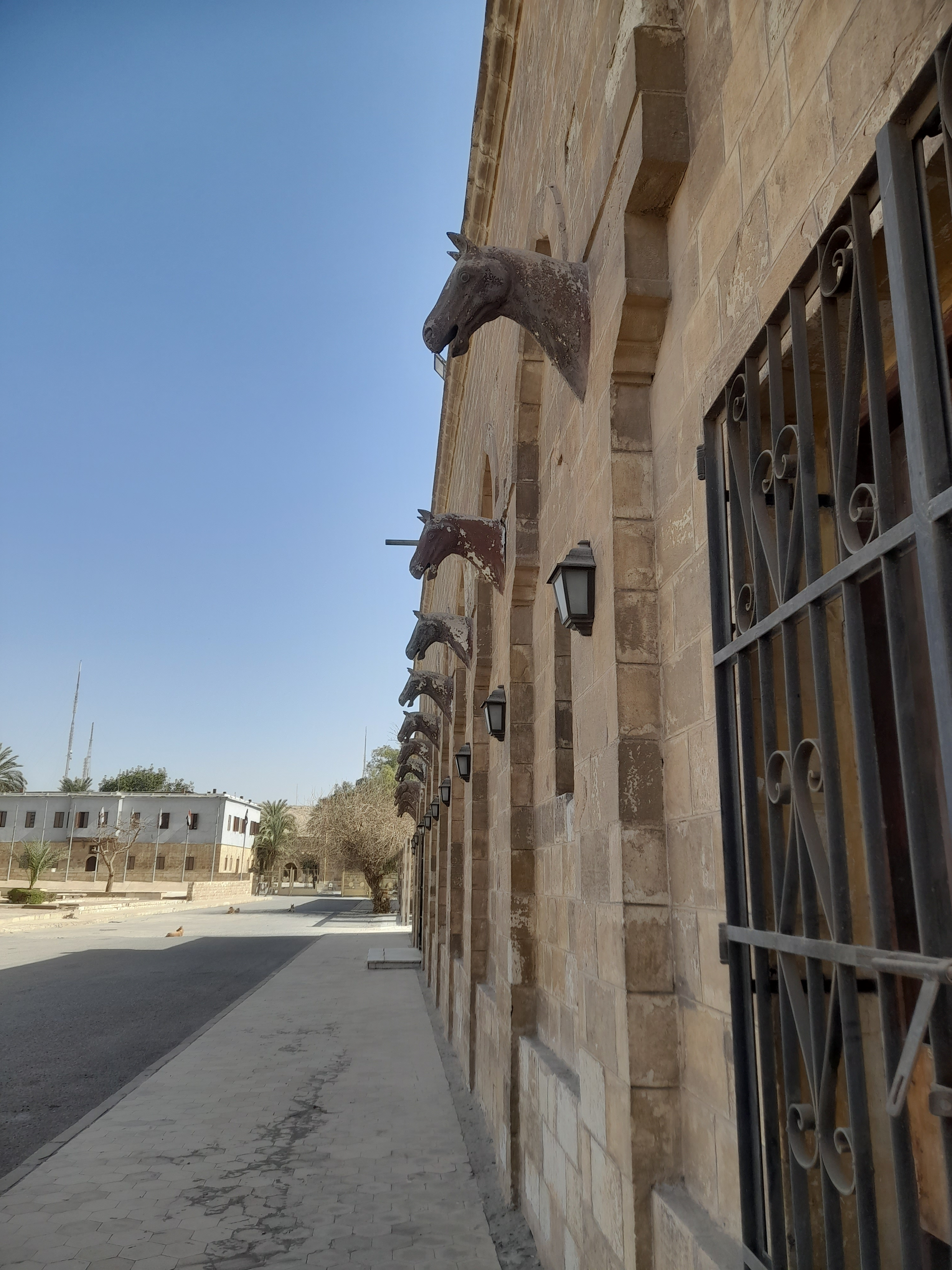
Facade detail of the museum

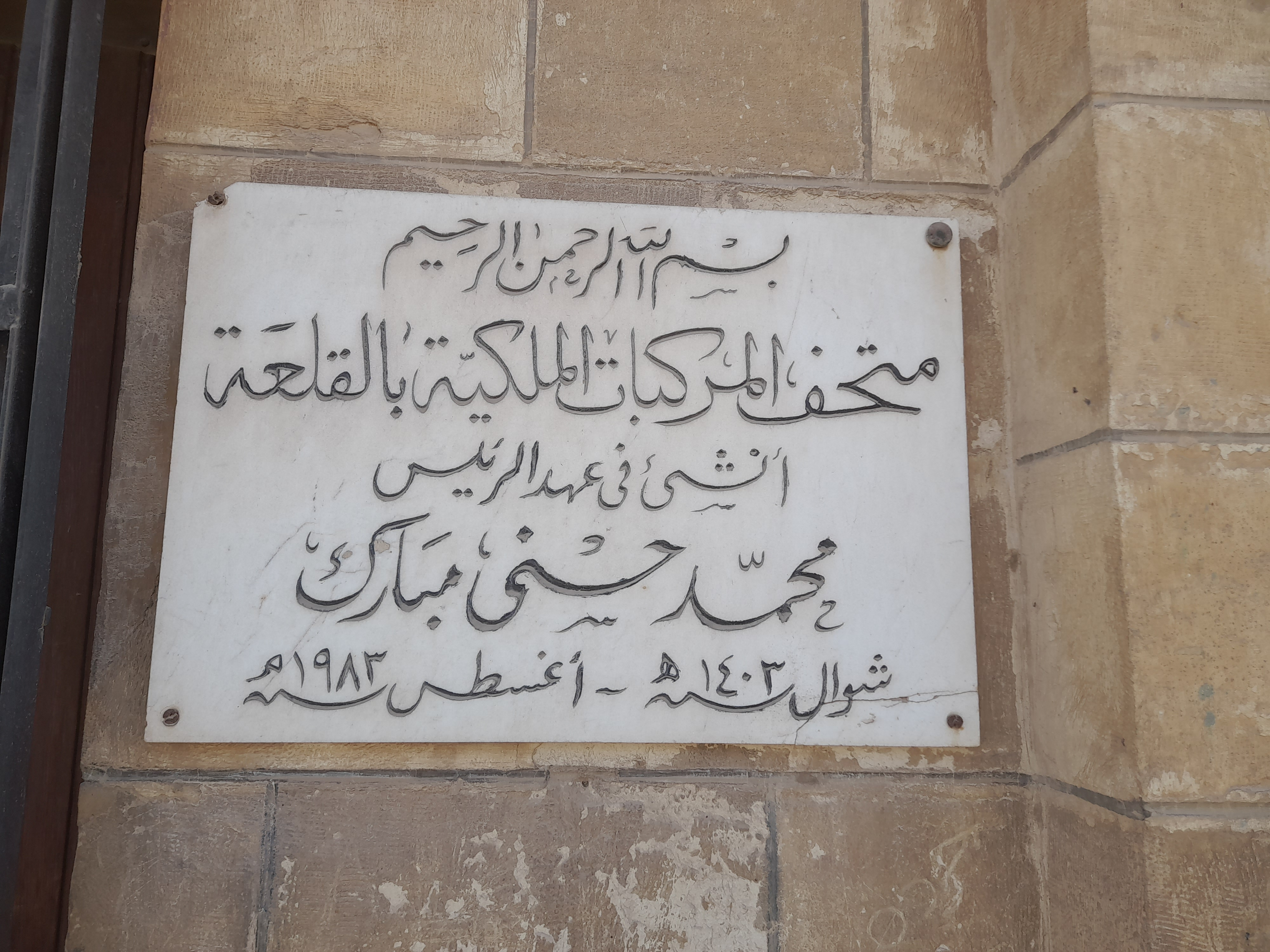
Entrance sign of the museum

== See also ==
- List of museums in Egypt
