= Angels Camp Museum =

- Location within California Angels Camp Museum (the United States)
- Location: Angels Camp, California
- Coordinates: 38.076288°N 120.545318°W
- Type: History museum
- Website: Official website

Angels Camp Museum is a history museum located in Angels Camp, California, in the United States. The museum focuses on the history of the California Gold Rush. Angels Camp Museum is located on 3 acres (1.2 ha) of the original land claim for Angels Mine, which dates back to the 1850s. It spreads out between four buildings and features a collection of twenty-nine restored horse-drawn carriages.

== History ==
Angels Mine dates back to the 1850s. The museum sits on a portion of the mine land claim, where two of the three veins of the Mother Lode meet. Approximately 200 miles (320 km) of tunnels and shafts are located in Angels Mine, which was named after goldminer Henry Angel. As of 2012 the museum director is Bob Rogers. The museum also owns the Altaville Grammar School, the state's oldest extant schoolhouse. Each year the museum waives its entry charges to host Gold Rush Day, celebrating the heritage of the gold rush with demonstrations, music, food, and costumed interpreters.

== Collection and exhibition ==
The museum's collection focuses primarily on wagons and carriages as well as early mining equipment. Other objects held in the collection include gold rush-era minerals, a nineteenth-century slot machine, a telephone switchboard used at Angels Camp, and twenty-nine restored horse-drawn vehicles. The museum also has films, historical photographs and general objects from the time period, such as typewriters and interior parts from the post office located at the historic Angels Camp. The main building has exhibitions featuring antiques and historical objects, and a small theater which shows the film Jump, a documentary about the Frog Jump Jubilee, an annual frog jumping contest. A garage on the property showcases the carriages, and another building features mining equipment.
