= Florida Carriage Museum & Resort =

The Grand Oaks Resort
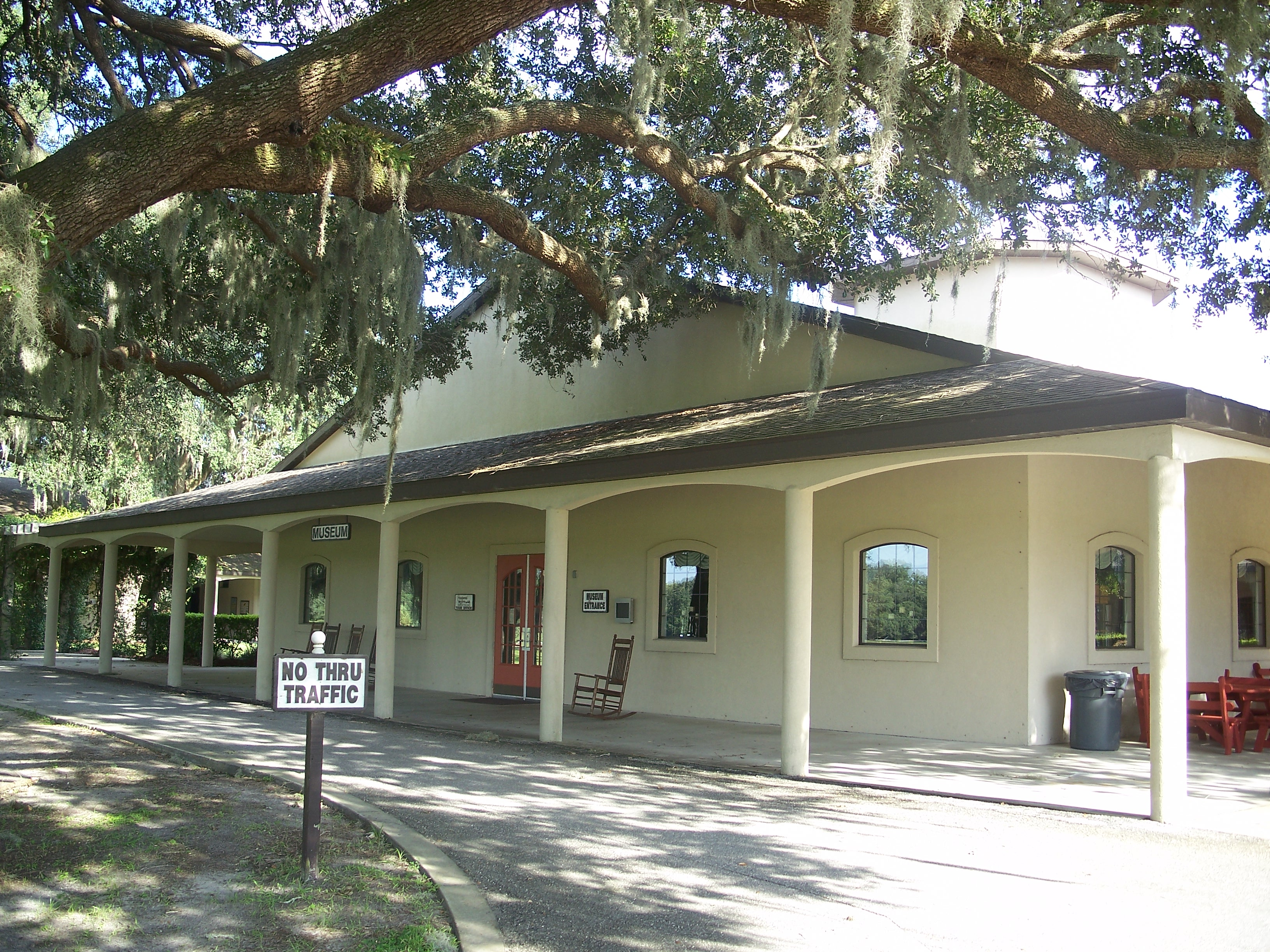

- Location within Florida
- Established: 2011
- Location: Weirsdale, Florida
- Coordinates: 28.95369°N 81.90488°W
- Type: Carriage museum
- Website: The Grand Oaks Resort

The Florida Carriage Museum was an equestrian-themed museum established by carriage collector Gloria Austin and located in Weirsdale, Florida. It contained more than 160 antique horse-drawn carriages from Europe and America, as well as equine-related artifacts and artwork. In 2011, Austin sold the 400-acre equestrian resort property, of which the museum was part, to her ex-husband, Tom Golisano; it was renamed Grand Oaks and the carriage museum became known as the Grand Oaks Museum. Formerly known to be a destination for carriage driving, the property has since hosted different equestrian athletes in a variety of disciplines and is a United States Equestrian Federation accredited training facility. In 2017, Grand Oaks sold and dispersed the majority of the carriage collection, thereby closing the museum. A portion of Austin's collection remains at Austin's Equine Heritage Institute, adjacent to Grand Oaks.
