= Geraz do Lima Carriage Museum =

Coordinates: 41.7030°N 8.6609°W

Geraz do Lima Carriage Museum is a museum in Geraz do Lima, Viana do Castelo, Portugal dedicated to Carriage.

It contains equine-related artifacts and artwork, as well as over 50 antique horse-drawn carriages from Europe and Americas.

== Gallery ==
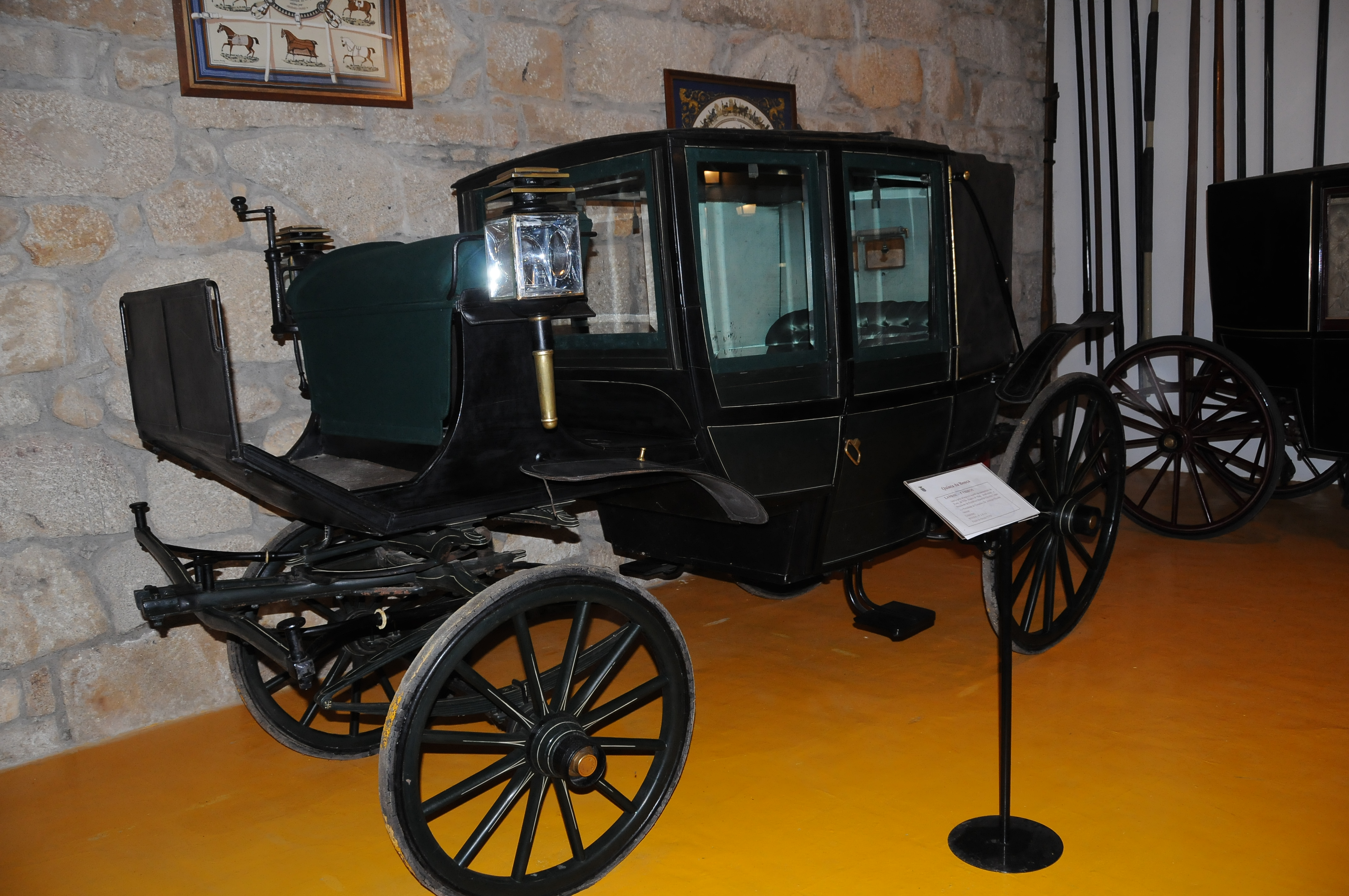
Five-glass landau

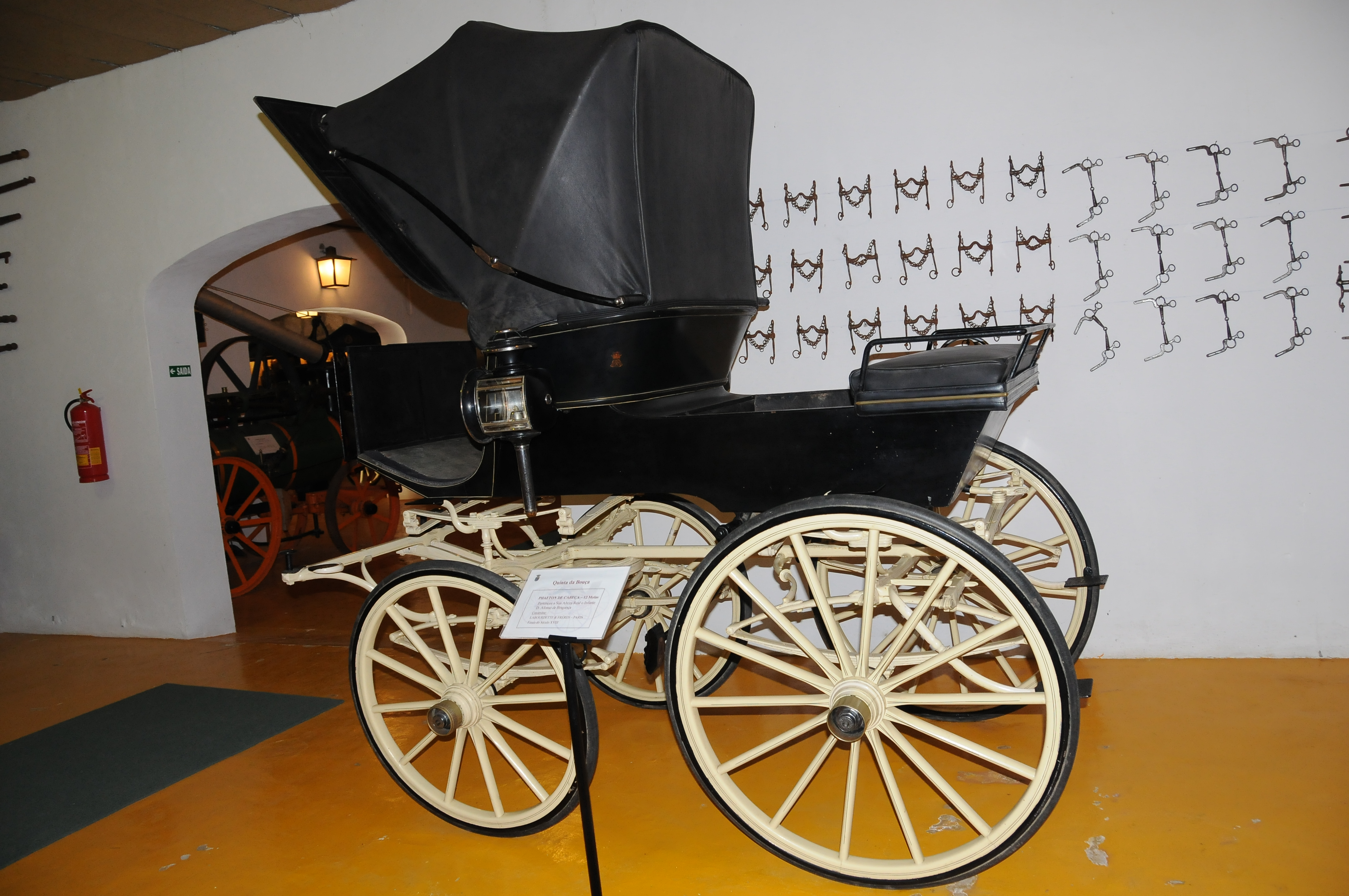
Phaeton

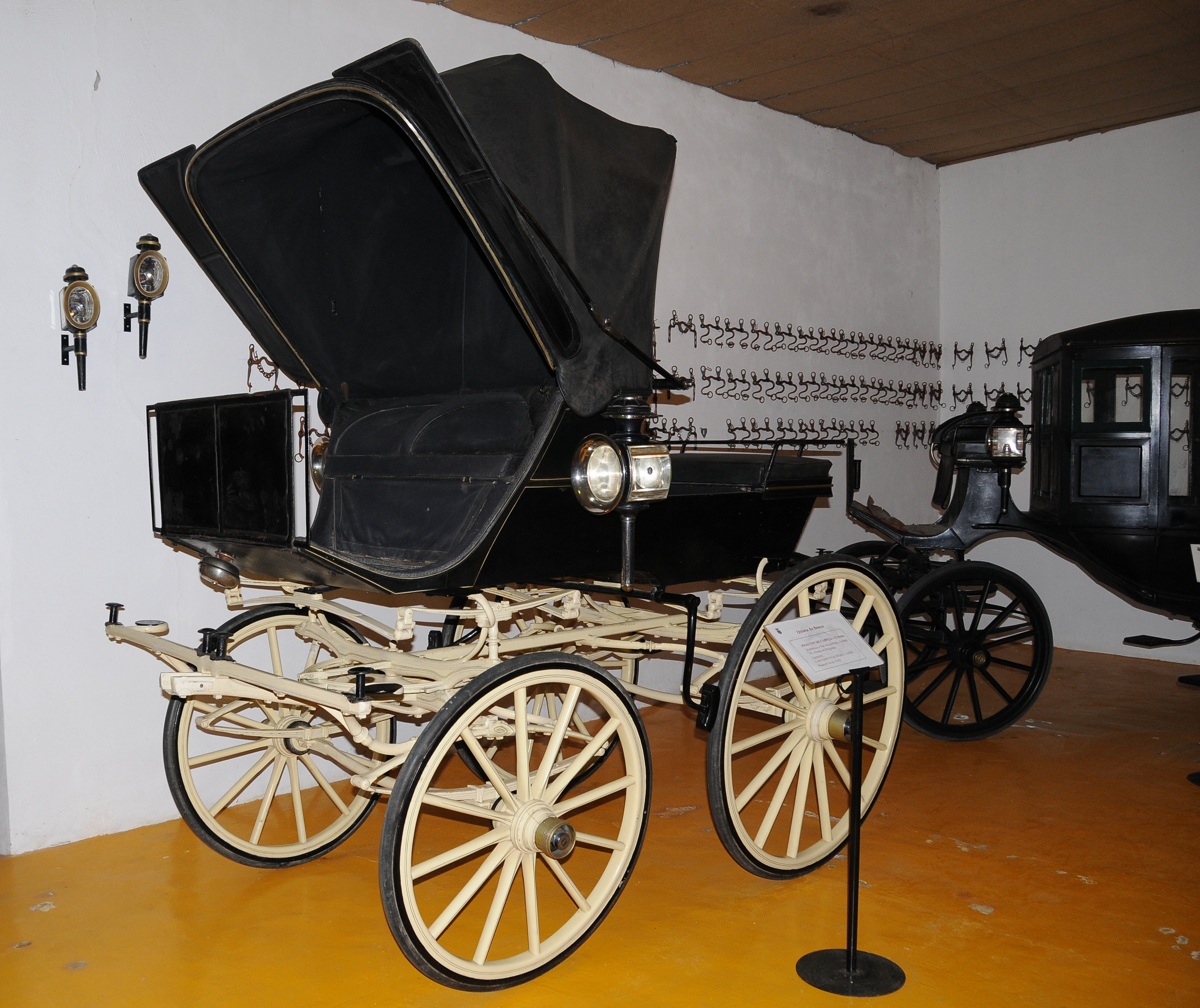
Phaeton

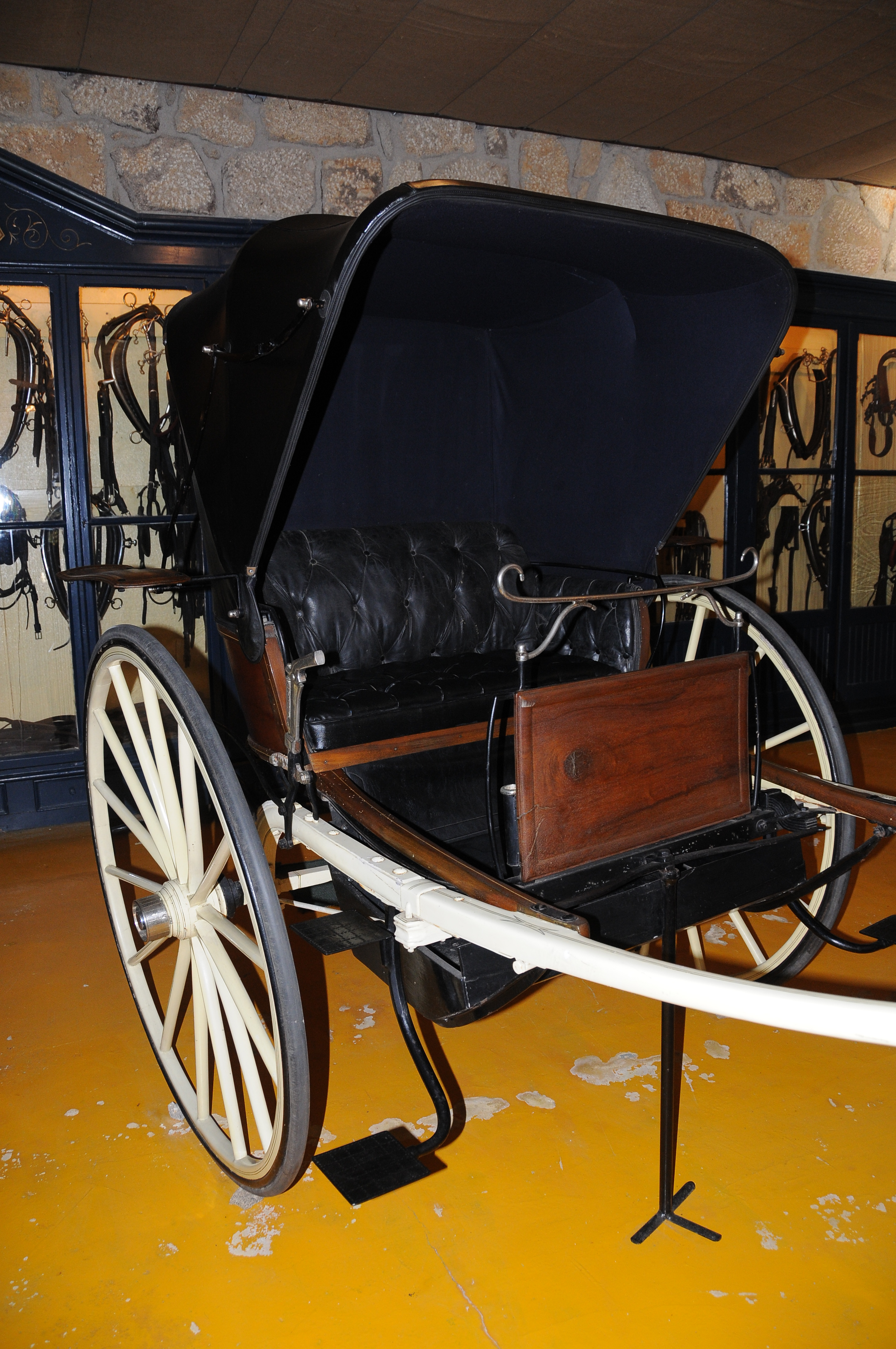
Tilbury
