= William Young =

William, Will, Bill or Billy Young may refer to:

== Arts and entertainment ==
- William Young (composer) (died 1662), English composer and viola da gambist
- William Young (architect) (1843–1900), Scottish architect, designer of Glasgow City Chambers
- William Young (playwright) (1847–1920), American playwright, writer and actor
- William Young (artist) (1875–1944), Australian watercolor painter
- Billy Young (singer) (1941–1999), American singer/songwriter
- William Allen Young (born 1954), African American actor
- William P. Young (born 1955), Canadian/American novelist
- Will Young (born 1979), English actor and singer/songwriter
- Bill Young (comedian) (died 2014), American comedian
- William Mark Young (1881–1946), American painter and commercial artist

== Business and industry ==
- William D. Young (engineer), American chemical engineer and pharmaceutical industry executive
- W. J. Young (William John Young, 1827–1896), American industrialist, founder of the W.J. Young Company
- William John Young (pastoralist) (1850–1931), Australian company chief executive and station manager
- Tom Young (trade unionist) (William Thomas Young, 1870–1953), New Zealand seaman and trade unionist
- William T. Young (1918–2004), American businessman
- William H. Young (labor leader) (born 1946), American labor leader, president of National Association of Letter Carriers
- William Chen Wing Young (1896–1974), Chinese-Australian businessman

== Military ==
- William Young (Royal Navy officer, born 1751) (1751–1821), British Royal Navy officer
- William Young (Royal Navy officer, born 1761) (1761–1847), British Royal Navy officer
- William Young (Medal of Honor) (1835–1878), American Civil War sailor and Medal of Honor recipient
- William Hugh Young (1838–1901), Confederate States Army brigadier general
- William Young (VC) (1876–1916), Scottish recipient of the Victoria Cross
- William Ramsay Young (1894–1965), Australian soldier
- William Young (veteran) (1900–2007), British military veteran, last surviving member of Royal Flying Corps

== Politics and law ==
=== Australia ===
- William Young (Australian politician) (1852–1915), New South Wales politician
- William Young (Tasmanian politician) (1912–2012), Australian politician
- Bill Young (Tasmanian politician) (1917–2003), Australian politician, member of the Tasmanian House of Assembly
- Bill Young (Western Australian politician) (1918–2012)

=== New Zealand ===
- Bill Young (New Zealand politician) (1913–2009)
- William Young (New Zealand politician) (fl. 1950), politician, member of the Legislative Council
- William Young (judge) (born 1952), justice of the Supreme Court of New Zealand

=== UK ===
- Sir William Young, 1st Baronet, of North Dean (1724–1788), British politician, colonial governor of Dominica
- Sir William Young, 2nd Baronet (1749–1815), British politician, colonial governor of Tobago
- Sir William Young, 4th Baronet (1806–1842), British politician
- William Tanner Young (fl. 1838–1845), British diplomat
- Sir William Young, 1st Baronet, of Bailieborough Castle (died 1848), British baronet of County Cavan, Ireland
- William Robert Young (died 1933), Irish linen merchant, politician and philanthropist
- William Young (Scottish politician) (1863–1942), Scottish member of parliament for East Perthshire and Perth

=== US ===
- William S. Young (1790–1827), US representative from Kentucky
- William Young (Wisconsin politician) (1821–1890), American politician
- William Young (Illinois politician), American politician from Illinois
- William Henry Young (politician) (1845–?), American politician in Wisconsin
- William Albin Young (1860–1928), US representative from Virginia
- Bill Young (Florida politician) (1930–2013), US representative from Florida
- William G. Young (born 1940), US district judge for the District of Massachusetts
- Bill Young (Nevada politician) (born 1956), American politician and sheriff of Clark County, Nevada
- William Cocke Young (1812–1862), American jurist and Confederate States Army colonel

=== Elsewhere ===
- William Young (Nova Scotia politician) (1799–1887), Canadian politician, premier of Nova Scotia
- Sir William Mackworth Young (1840–1924), member of the Indian Civil Service and lieutenant-governor of the Punjab
- William Douglas Young (1859–1943), governor of the Falkland Islands
- William Alfred Young (1863–1911), president of council, and magistrate of the British Overseas Territory of Pitcairn Island

== Science and medicine ==
- William Henry Young (1863–1942), English mathematician
- William John Young (biochemist) (1878–1942), English biochemist
- William Alexander Young (1889–1928), Scottish doctor and surgeon
- William Gould Young (1902–1980), American physical organic chemist, winner of the Priestley Medal
- William D. Young (doctor), Canadian doctor whose work was commemorated with the Dr. William D. Young Memorial fountain in Toronto
- William R. Young (oceanographer) (born 1955), Australian-American oceanographer

== Sports ==
=== American football ===
- Billy Young (American football) (1901–1971), player for the Green Bay Packers
- Bill Young (American football lineman) (1914–1994), player for the Washington Redskins
- Bill Young (American football coach) (1946–2021), college football defensive coordinator

=== Association football (soccer) ===
- William Young (footballer, born 1884) (1884–1917), English footballer
- William Young (footballer, born 1892) (1892–1965), English footballer
- Billy Young (footballer) (1938–2025), Irish soccer player and manager
- Bill Young (soccer) (born 1950), Canadian international soccer player

=== Australian rules football ===
- Bill Young (footballer, born 1886) (1886–1959), player for St Kilda
- Bill Young (footballer, born 1931) (1931–2020)
- Will Young (Australian footballer) (born 1990)

=== Cricket ===
- William Young (English cricketer) (1861–1933)
- William Young (Scottish cricketer) (1896–1966)
- Billy Young (cricketer) (born 1970), English cricketer
- Will Young (cricketer) (born 1992), New Zealand cricketer

=== Other sports ===
- William J. Young (coach) (1881–1957), American college basketball and football coach
- William Pennington Young (1896–1968), American Negro league baseball player
- Bill Young (cycling) (1905–1994), Australian cycling administrator
- W. B. Young (1916–2013), Scottish rugby union player
- Bill Young (ice hockey) (born 1947), Canadian ice hockey player
- Bill Young (rugby union) (born 1974), Australian rugby union footballer

== Others ==
- William Weston Young (1776–1847), British Quaker entrepreneur, artist, and inventor
- William C. Young, (1842–1896), American minister and educator, eighth president of Centre College
- William Hooper Young (1871–?), convicted American murderer
- William Gordon Young (1904–1974), Australian physical culturist and public servant
- Bill Young (CIA officer) (1934–2011), American CIA officer largely responsible for the Laotian Civil War
- Leslie Isben Rogge (a.k.a. Bill Young, born 1940), American bank robber
- William R. Young (born 1946), Canadian civil servant

== See also ==
- Willie Young (disambiguation)
- William Yonge (disambiguation)
