= William John Young =

William John Young may refer to:

- William John Young (biochemist) (1878–1942), English biochemist
- William John Young (pastoralist) (1850–1931), Australian company chief executive and station manager
- W. J. Young (1827–1896), American lumber businessman
- Willie Young (footballer, born 1956), Scottish footballer

== See also ==
- William Young (disambiguation)
