= William J. Young =

William J. Young may refer to:

- W. J. Young (William John Young, 1827–1896), American industrialist, founder of the W.J. Young Company
- William John Young (pastoralist) (1850–1931), Australian company chief executive and station manager
- William John Young (biochemist) (1878–1942), English biochemist
- William J. Young (coach) (1881–1957), American college basketball and football coach
