= Sidney Goodwin =

Sidney Goodwin may refer to:

- Sidney Goodwin (artist) (1875–1944), English/Australian artist
- Sidney Leslie Goodwin (1910–1912), "The Unknown Child" from the sinking of RMS Titanic
