= Ivor Lewis =

Canadian artist (1882–1958)

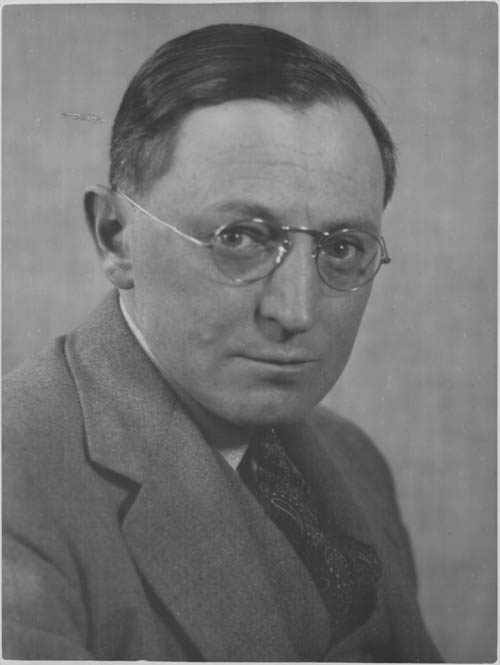
- Born: Ivor Rhys Lewis; 1882; Wales
- Died: 1958 (aged 75–76)
- Occupations: artist and business director

Ivor Rhys Lewis (1882 – November 1958) was a Canadian artist and business director.

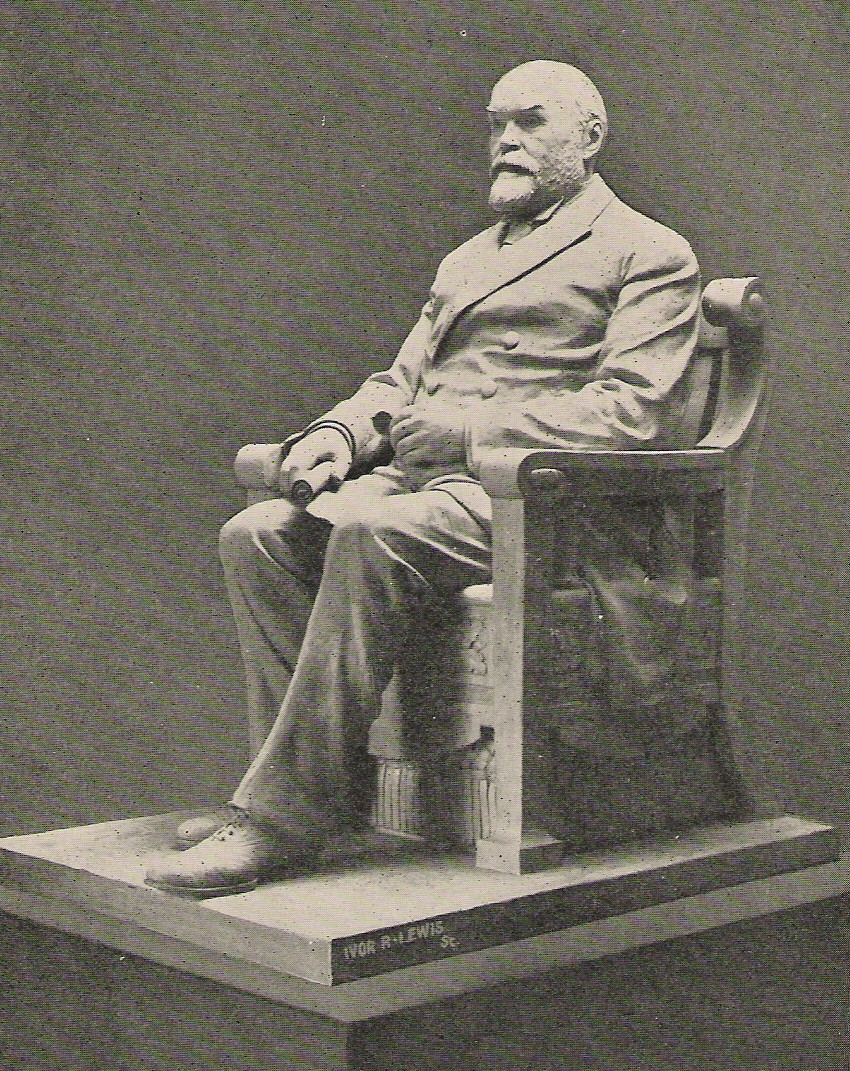
Timothy Eaton statue by Ivor Lewis

Lewis was born in Wales, but emigrated to Canada as a small boy. He trained as an artist at the Ontario School of Art, and was hired in the art department of the Eaton's department store chain in Toronto. In 1919, he was commissioned by his fellow Eaton's employees to create the noted life-size statue of Timothy Eaton, which was presented to the Eaton family in honour of the store's 50th anniversary.

Lewis was an accomplished painter, and he was also known for creating the medallions on the Dr. William D. Young Memorial in Toronto's Kew Gardens. Along with C. W. Jefferys and other artists, Lewis co-founded the Graphic Arts Club (later named the Canadian Society of Graphic Art), which by the 1940s became one of the primary artists' groups in Canada. He was also a noted actor and singer, and actively participated in Toronto's theatre scene.

Ivor Lewis was a prominent member of the Eaton's management team, serving as both Supervisor of Publicity and Public Relations and Staff Superintendent. He held the latter position until 1950. He was made a director of the T. Eaton Co. Limited in 1942. Ivor Lewis died in 1958.

Lewis' 1922 bronze sculpture War Memorial is on public display in Burlington Ontario.
