= Willie Young =

Willie Young or Willy Young may refer to:

== Sports ==
=== American football ===
- Willie Young (offensive tackle, born 1943) (1943–2020), American football player
- Willie Young (offensive tackle, born 1947) (1947–2008), American football player
- Willie Young (defensive end) (born 1985), American football player

=== Association football ===
- Willie Young (footballer, born 1951) (1951–2025), Scottish association footballer, a central defender who played mostly for Aberdeen, Tottenham Hotspur, Arsenal and Nottingham Forest
- Willie Young (footballer, born 1956), Scottish association footballer who played on the wing for Aston Villa and Torquay United
- Willie Young (referee), Scottish football referee in 2003–04 Scottish League Cup

=== Other sports ===
- Willie Young (curler) (died 1986), Scottish curler
- Willie Young (baseball) (1912–2002), American baseball player
- Willie Young (basketball) (born 1973), American basketball coach and former player

== Other people ==
- Willie Wayne Young (born 1942), American artist
- Willy Young, former name of William Yang (photographer) (born 1943), Australian social history photographer and filmmaker

== See also ==
- William Young (disambiguation)
