= William Yonge =

William Yonge may refer to:

- Sir William Yonge, 4th Baronet (c. 1693–1755), English politician
- William Yonge (15th century MP) for Newcastle-under-Lyme
- William Yonge (MP for Bristol), in 1361, MP for Bristol
- William Yonge (priest) (1753–1845), Archdeacon of Norwich
- William Yonge (judge) (died c.1437), Lord Chancellor of Ireland

== See also ==
- William Young (disambiguation)
