= Willie Wayne Young =

American artist

Willie Young (April 16, 1942 – November 21, 2023) was a 20th-century American artist. Young was mainly self-taught, and his work has been exhibited alongside other prominent outsider artists, such as Bill Traylor, Nellie Mae Rowe and Thornton Dial. The main body of his work consists of delicately rendered graphite drawings.

Karen Wilkin, who has written for the Katonah Museum of Art's recent exhibition catalog, described Young's works as “eerie, not quite identifiable orchestrations of silvery tones.”

== Biography ==
Willie Wayne Young was born in Dallas, Texas. His mother worked several jobs to sustain her family and was able to purchase a family home in what was then an underdeveloped East Dallas, where Young still resides. He attended Lincoln High School, but failed to graduate due to undiagnosed dyslexia.

Willie came to the attention of Dallas-based artist and teacher Chapman Kelley, who became a friend and mentor. Young's time at Chapman Kelly studio, between 1959 and 1963, allowed him to refine his drawing technique and also served as an introduction to the Dallas art world. Many noteworthy artists either exhibited or taught at the Chapman Kelly Atelier, including Ann Cushing, Deforrest Judd, and Otis Dozier. Several well-known visiting artists also passed through the school during Young's time of study, including Elaine de Kooning, Hobson Pittman, Ben Kamihira, and David DeLong.

Through his life, Young worked various jobs to support himself, and, in the early 1970s, briefly assisted with the installation of linoleum. This job proved to be critical to his artistic development, as he began working with the rolls of heavy brown kraft paper used to wrap the linoleum to make large-format, almost scroll-like drawings.

Young later began working as a shoe-shiner, a trade he continued for many years at Griffin Barber Stylist in Farmer's Branch, a suburb outside of Dallas. It was in this barbershop that Young refined his drawing skills in between shoeshines, starting in 1995. Dianne Solis, writing about Young in the Dallas Morning News in 2009, described his unconventional studio: “The tools of his twin trades spill near his patched black leather chair. Camel-hair brushes, and waxy tins wait to buff scuffs on boots and brogues. Look closer and see lean, green graphite pencils, and a magnifying glass for detail…: ‘This is where I do my best work, Young says.’

== Drawings ==
Young's drawings are almost exclusively done with a standard HB2 graphite pencil, with occasional barely visible highlights of white graphite. Early in his career, he drew on kraft paper and discarded cardboard that he found at job sites and through his neighborhood. He would also draw on a smaller scale in spiral notebooks, and, later in his career, in artists’ sketchbooks. His subject matter was usually inspired by detailed elements from the natural world: trees, branches, bones, and plants. He also composed numerous drawings that are more geometric, geologic, or architectural in nature. He did not draw exact likenesses of the objects, nor was he interested in exact renditions. Instead, he drew the object from memory, working through multiple variations of the initial subject. As was described in a wall text accompanying Young's work in a 2015 exhibition; “(Young’s) precisely-rendered illustrations could be of the chicken bones that he keeps in a glass jar, or the acorns falling from the tree outside his barbershop window. However, in Young’s drawings, they become intriguing images that dance and float on the surface of the paper, somewhere between the real world and fantasy land".

== Artistic career ==
Young had some local success selling to Dallas area collectors and buyers from the late 1960s to the early 1990s, including Waxahachie-based outsider art collectors, Bruce and Julie Webb, who were early supporters of Young's work. In addition to being featured in exhibitions at Chapman Kelly Studio, Young's work was also shown through the 1990s and early 2000s at Mason Murer Fine Art Gallery in Atlanta, at Webb Gallery in Waxahachie, and at Carl Hammer Gallery in Chicago. New York gallery Ricco Maresca mounted Young's first solo exhibition in 1993, which was followed by another solo show in 1994 at the Goldie Paley Gallery at Moore College of Art and Design. His work at this time also caught the attention of curators at American museums and was included in 1995 in “A World of Their Own: Twentieth Century American Folk Art” and the Newark Museum, as well as “A Labor of Love”, curated by Marcia Tucker of the New Museum of New York in 1996. In 2009, his work was the subject of a retrospective curated by Edleeca Thompson at the African American Museum in Dallas and, in 2015, Young's work was included in “Inside the Outside: Five Self-Taught Artists from the William Louis-Dreyfus Foundation” at the Katonah Museum of Art, an exhibition which traveled to both the Weatherspoon Museum in Greensboro and the Baker Museum in Naples.

Sarah Gold, reviewing the "Inside the Outside Exhibition" for the New York Times, wrote of Young’s work: “His untitled pieces feature enigmatic objects — unrecognizable, but executed as carefully as medical illustrations — suspended in negative space, and all of them share a certain sort of clinical, sci-fi aspect. One drawing, of a segmented, horn-shaped form, might be a piece of armor worn by a futuristic warrior; another long-stemmed, geometric structure might be a space station on a distant planet. Still, other shapes, bearing long articulated tendrils, suggest protozoan life-forms seen under a microscope.”

In 2008, Tanner|Hill Gallery of Chattanooga, TN, and Atlanta, GA began representing Willie Young, and featured his drawings in numerous exhibitions, as well as at art fairs throughout the United States, including at the Works on Paper at the Park Avenue Armory in New York in 2009, Art Chicago in 2011 and Art San Francisco in 2012. In 2016, his work was featured in a solo exhibition at Tanner|Hill Gallery at the Outsider Art Fair.

== Exhibitions ==
SOLO EXHIBITIONS

2015 Prospect New Orleans, New Orleans, LA.

2009 The Visionary Art of Willie Young, Curated by Edleeca Thompson, African

American Museum, Dallas, TX.

2009 Willie Wayne Young: Recent Works, Tanner|Hill Gallery, Chattanooga, TN.

1994 The Drawings of Willie Wayne Young, Goldie Paley Gallery, Moore College of Art and Design, Philadelphia, PA.

1993 Willie Young, Ricco Maresca Gallery, New York, NY.

GROUP/TWO-PERSON EXHIBITIONS

2017 Inside the Outside: Five Self-Taught Artists from the William Louis-Dreyfus Foundation, Baker Museum of Art, Naples, FL.

2016 Inside the Outside: Five Self-Taught Artists from the William Louis-Dreyfus Foundation, Weatherspoon Art Museum, Greensboro, NC.

2015 Inside the Outside: Five Self-Taught Artists from the William Louis-Dreyfus Foundation, Katonah Museum of Art, Katonah, NY.

2010 Rotation, Tanner|Hill Gallery, Atlanta, GA.

2008 Introductions, Tanner|Hill Gallery, Chattanooga, TN.

2002 Obsession, Carl Hammer Gallery, Chicago, IL.

1999 Morgan & Young: Presidential Portraits by Ike Morgan and Root Drawings by Willie Young, Webb Gallery, Waxahachie, TX.

1996 A Labor of Love, New Museum of Contemporary Art, Curated by Marcia

Tucker, New York, NY.

1995 A World of Their Own: Twentieth-Century American Folk Art.

The Newark Museum, Newark, NJ.

1994 Mason Murer Fine Art Gallery, Atlanta, GA.

1964 Atelier Chapman Kelly, Dallas, TX.

ART FAIRS

2016 Solo Exhibition, Outsider Art Fair, New York, NY, Tanner|Hill Gallery.

2014 Outsider Art Fair, New York, NY, Tanner|Hill Gallery.

2012 Outsider Art Fair, New York, NY, Tanner|Hill Gallery.

ArtSanFrancisco, Fort Mason, Tanner|Hill Gallery.

2011 Art Chicago, IL, Tanner|Hill Gallery.

Dallas Art Fair, Dallas, TX, Tanner|Hill Gallery.

2010 The Intuit Show of Folk and Outsider Art, Chicago, IL, Tanner|Hill Gallery

Art Miami, FL, Tanner|Hill Gallery.

2009 Works on Paper, Park Avenue Armory, New York, NY, Tanner|Hill Gallery. 2008 LAAS, Santa Monica, CA, Tanner|Hill Gallery.

REVIEWS AND PUBLICATIONS

-Trenton Doyle Hancock, “A Question of the Visionary, ” catalog essay accompanying exhibition “Inside the Outside: Five Self-Taught Artists from the Louis-Dreyfus Collection,” Katonah Museum of Art, NY, 2015.

-Karen Wilkin, “Apart from the Mainstream,” catalog essay accompanying exhibition “Inside the Outside: Five Self-Taught Artists from the Louis-Dreyfus Collection,” Katonah Museum of Art, NY, 2015.

- Sarah Gold, “Outsider Art under one roof at the Katonah Museum of Art,” New York Times, NY Region, August 13, 2015.

- Minnie Payne “Willie Wayne Young Sketches Between Shoeshine Jobs”, Senior Voice, May – June 2010.

- Dianne Solis, “’Shine Man’ polishes his sketches in between shoes,” The Dallas Morning News, October 18, 2009.

- Tanya Heinrich, “A Labor of Love”, Folk Art: Magazine of the Museum of the Museum of American Folk Art, Spring 1996.

AWARDS

2009 Recognition of Achievement Award. Farmer's Branch City Council.
