= Albert Goodwin (artist) =

English landscape artist

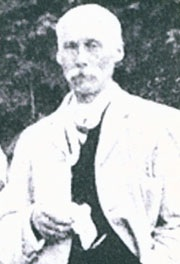
Albert Goodwin (ca. 1900)

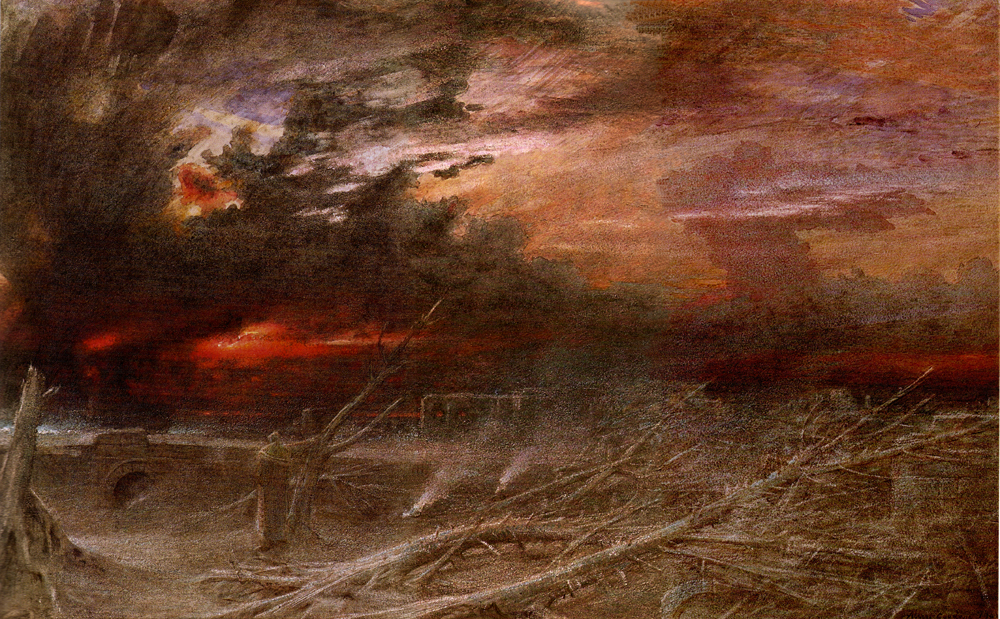
Apocalypse, 1903

Albert Goodwin RWS (1845–1932) was an English landscape painter, usually in watercolour. His work shows the influence of J. M. W. Turner.

Goodwin was born in Maidstone in Kent, the son of a builder and one of 9 children. After leaving school he became an apprentice draper. His exceptional artistic ability was recognised at an early age and he went on to study with the Pre-Raphaelite artists Arthur Hughes and Ford Madox Brown - the latter predicting that he would become "one of the greatest landscape painters of the age".

At the age of 15 his first painting was exhibited at the Royal Academy. He became an associate member of the Royal Watercolour Society (RWS) in 1876. He was championed by the famous art critic John Ruskin who took him on a tour of Europe, where he made many sketches from nature which were later turned into watercolours. During his lifetime he travelled extensively throughout Britain and Europe, and visited many other countries including a trip to Canada in 1890 accompanied by his nephew and fellow artist Sidney Goodwin.

Goodwin was a prolific artist, producing over 800 works and continuing to paint well into his eighties. His wide variety of landscape subjects reflected his love of travel and show the influence of Turner, with whom he felt a strong affinity. In later works he developed experimental techniques such as using ink over watercolour to achieve atmospheric lighting effects.

== Gallery ==
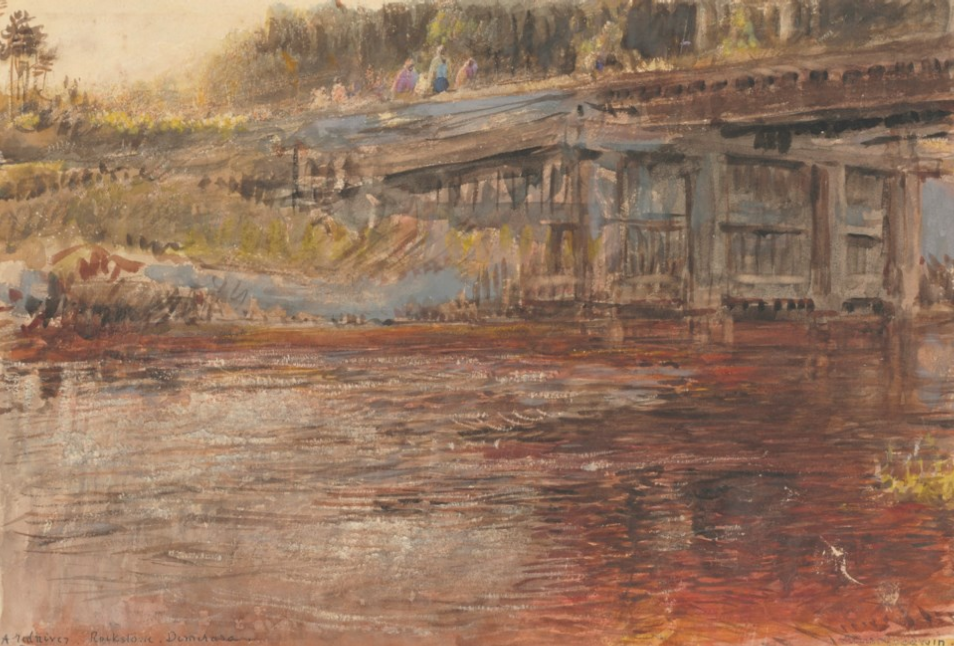
Rockstone, Demerara, Guyana - 1902

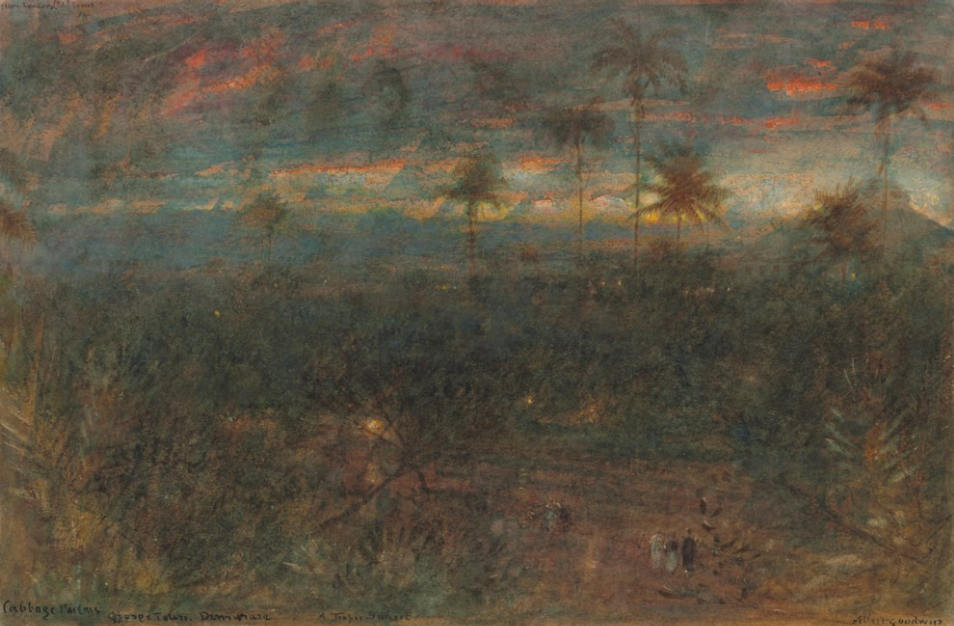
Cabbage palms, Demerara, Guyana - 1902

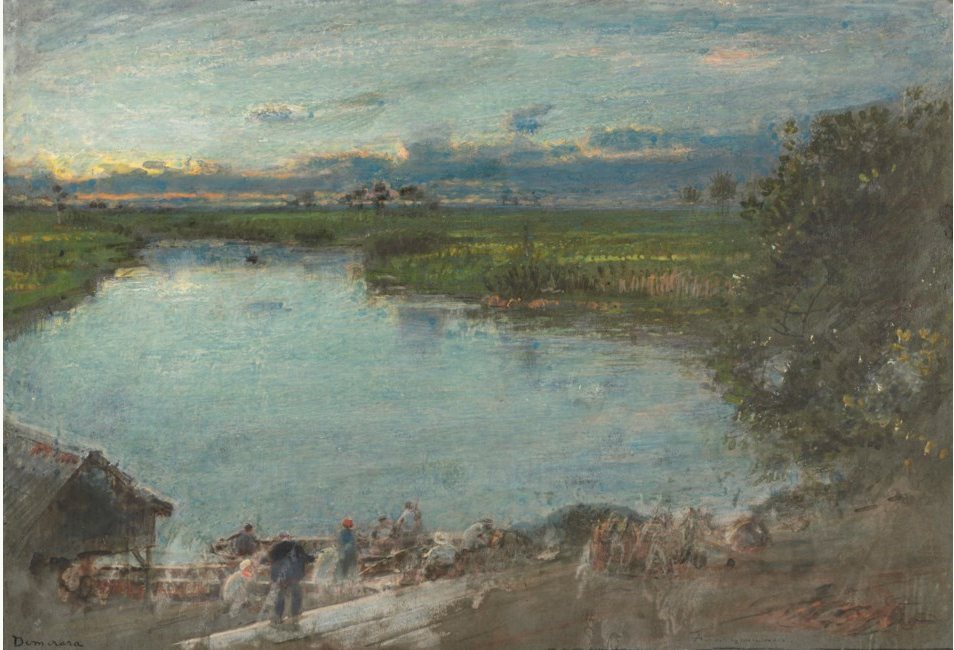
Demerara, Guyana, 1902

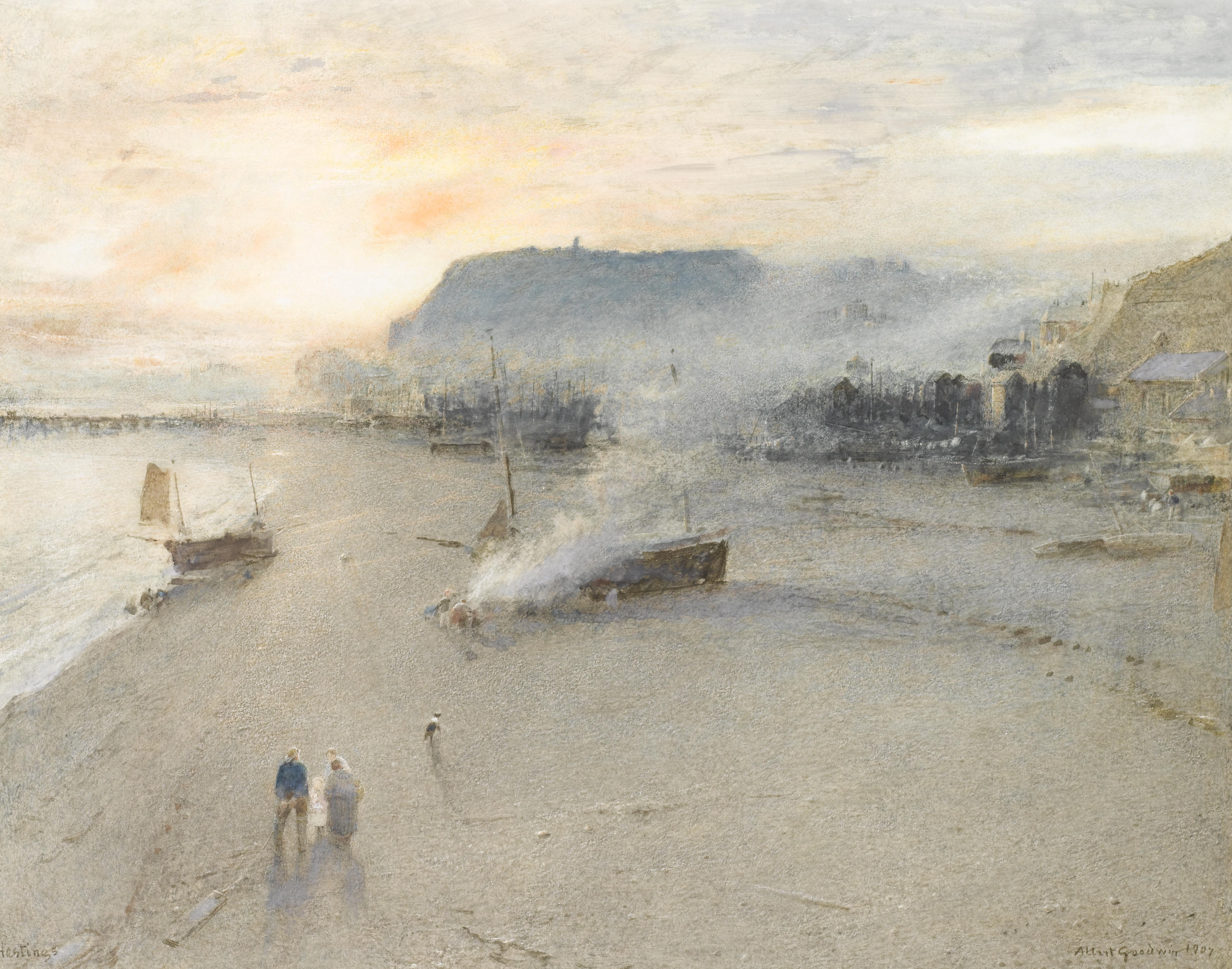
Hastings, watercolour, 1907
