= Kew Gardens (Toronto) =

Public park in Toronto, Canada

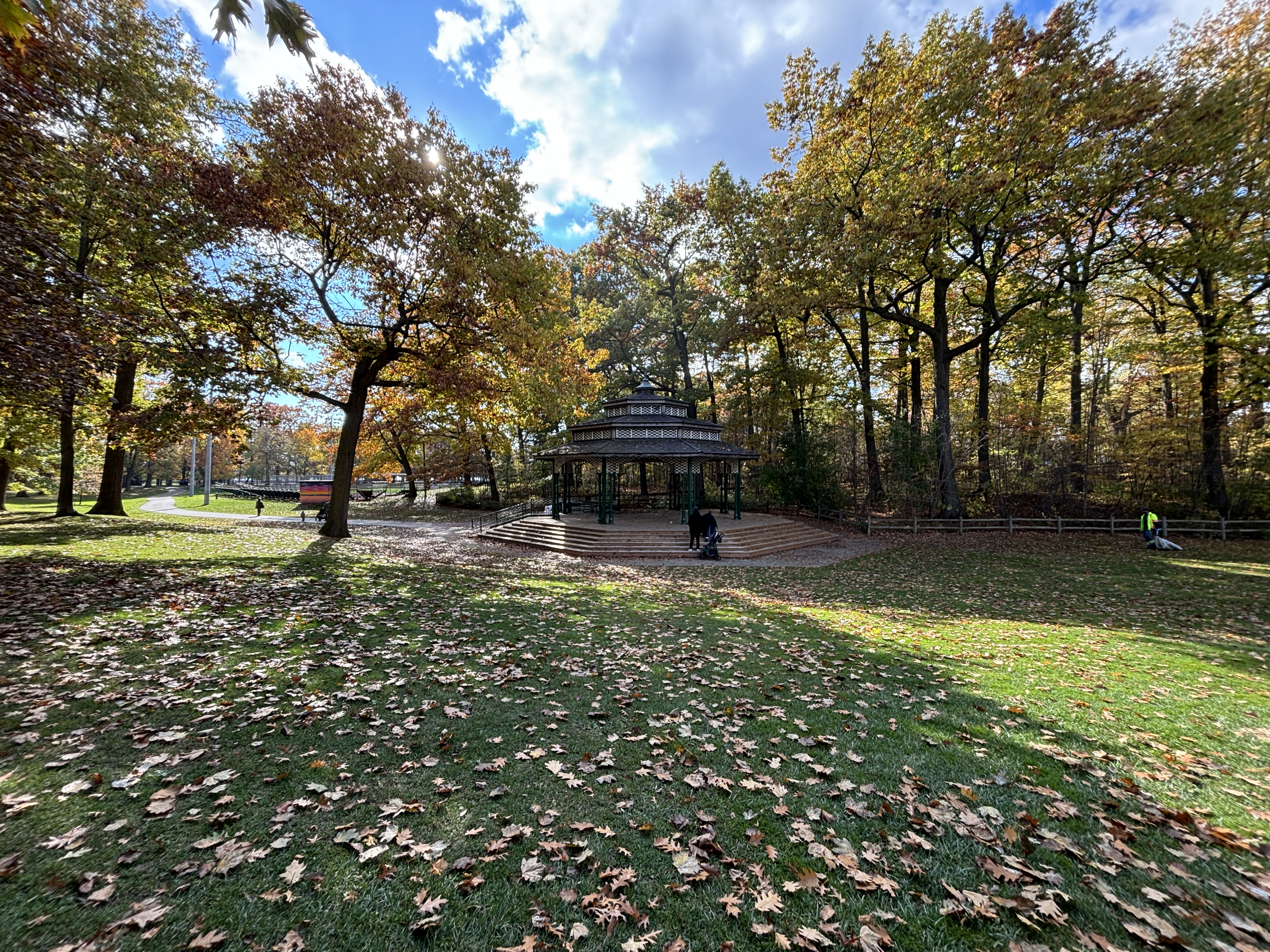
- The Alex Christie Bandstand in 2023

- Location within Toronto
- Type: Public Park
- Location: Toronto, Ontario, Canada
- Coordinates: 43°40′07″N 79°17′55″W
- Area: 20.7 acres (8.4 ha)
- Created: 1879
- Operator: City of Toronto
- Website: www.toronto.ca/explore-enjoy/parks-recreation/places-spaces/parks-and-recreation-facilities/location/?id=107&title=Kew-Gardens

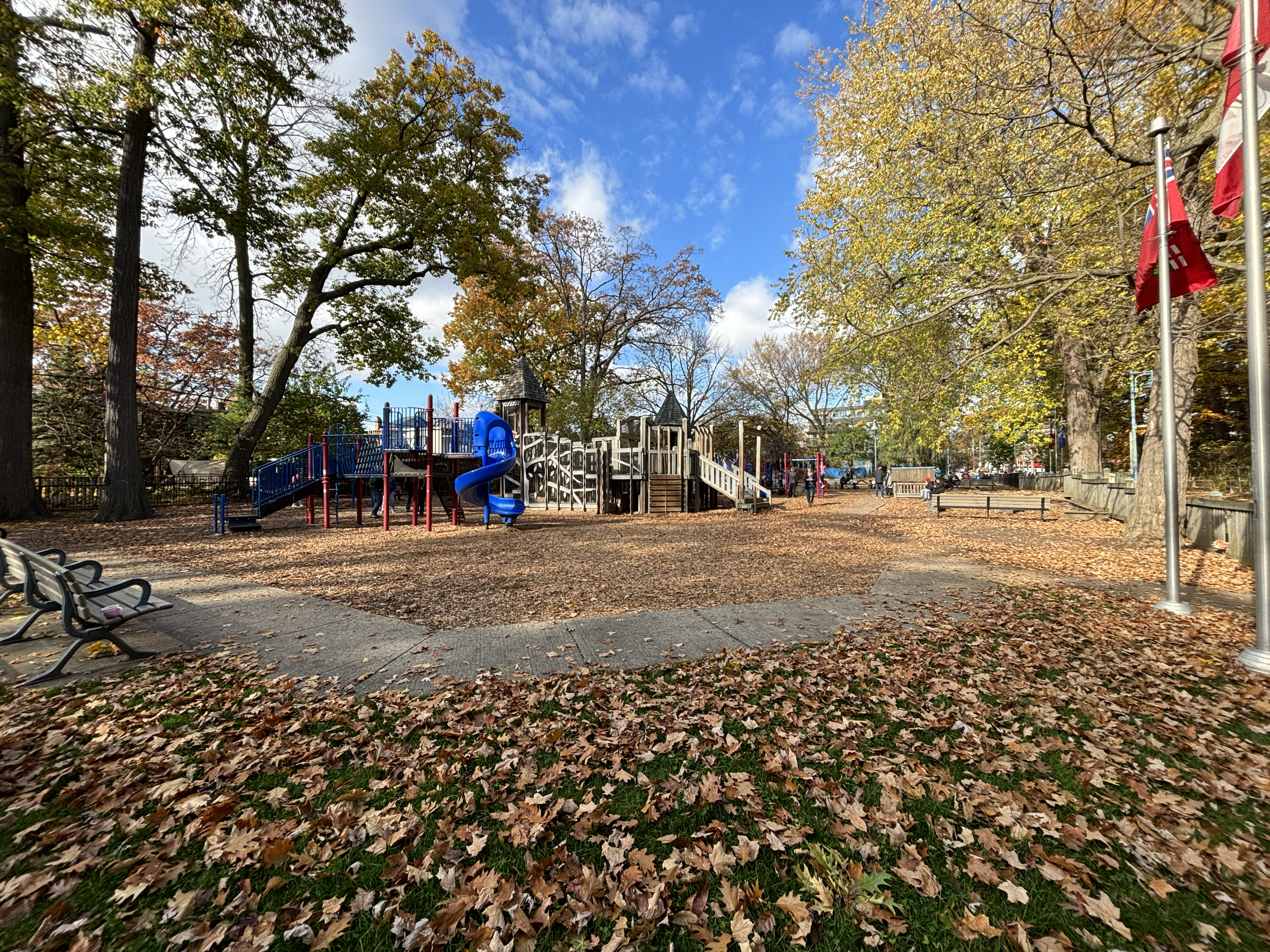
Children Playground

Kew Gardens is a large park in The Beaches neighbourhood of Toronto, Ontario, Canada. The park stretches from Queen Street East to Lake Ontario at Kew Beach.

The park began as a private 20.7-acre (8.4 ha) farm owned by Joseph Williams in the 1850s. As more visitors from the city began to visit the lake front he transformed his holdings into a tourist destination. He set up a large park and built several recreation facilities on the site beginning in 1879, naming it after Kew Gardens in London.

Williams built a substantial house for himself on the site, which still stands and is home to the park's caretaker. On the lakeshore Williams built facilities for swimming and boating. Inland there were picnic areas, trails, tennis courts and lawn bowling. A substantial clubhouse, as well as guest cottages were also constructed. Described by Williams as "A Place of Innocent Amusements," the park was much more genteel than others in the area with no noisy rides or liquor being served. It soon became a popular destination, easily reached from the city via the Queen streetcar.

The park was purchased by the City of Toronto in 1907 for $43,700 and turned into a municipal park. Over the years, the marshland in the south was filled in and the waterfront beach area was redeveloped. Most of the buildings were demolished, as the amusement industry shifted to the much larger Scarboro Beach Amusement Park nearby (located to the east and west of Balmy Beach).

Today the park is one of the main public venues in the Beaches neighbourhood. It is home to a number of facilities including tennis courts, a baseball diamond, a wading pool, and in winter, a skating rink. A number of historic buildings survive, including Williams' cottage, the bandstand, and the Leuty Lifeguard Station (c. 1920). In the northeast corner of the park is the historic Beaches branch of the Toronto Public Library. A number of monuments and memorials are also now located in the park, including the Dr. William D. Young Memorial. It is also the main venue for the Beaches International Jazz Festival each summer. In 2012, the Queen Street Visioning study proposed an interface improvement to the north portion of the park and in 2016 a 17 metre aluminum screen was installed in the space, among other features.
