= William Young (footballer, born 1884) =

English footballer

Personal information
- Full name: William Young
- Date of birth: 1884
- Place of birth: Cannock, England
- Date of death: 12 September 1917 (aged 32–33)
- Place of death: France
- Position: Wing half

Senior career*
Years	Team	Apps	(Gls)
1904–1905	Chadsmoor Celtic		
1905–1906	Hednesford Victoria		
1906–1907	Hednesford Town		
1907–1910	West Bromwich Albion	19	(2)
1910–1911	Hednesford Town		
1911	Wednesbury		
1912	Worcester City		
1913	Kidderminster Harriers		
Total		19	(2)
- * Club domestic league appearances and goals

William Young (1884 – 12 September 1917) was an English footballer who played in the Football League for West Bromwich Albion.

== Personal life ==
Young worked as a miner. In November 1914, he enlisted in the British Army to serve during the First World War. Serving in Gallipoli, Egypt, and France, he was wounded around October 1916. After returning to the front as a private in the Northumberland Fusiliers, he was shot in the head and died of his injuries on 12 September 1917. He is buried at Tincourt New British Cemetery.
