= William Young (English cricketer) =

English cricketer

Personal information
- Full name: William Young
- Born: 8 March 1861; Staveley, Derbyshire, England
- Died: 6 October 1933 (aged 72); Staveley, Derbyshire, England
- Batting: Unknown
- Role: Wicket-keeper

Career statistics
Competition	First-class
Matches	1
Runs scored	21
Batting average	21.00
100s/50s	–/–
Top score	21*
Balls bowled	–
Wickets	–
Bowling average	–
5 wickets in innings	–
10 wickets in match	–
Best bowling	–
Catches/stumpings	1/–
- Source: Cricinfo, 28 July 2013

William Young (8 March 1861 – 6 October 1933) was an English cricketer. White's batting style is unknown, though it is known he played as a wicket-keeper. He was born at Staveley, Derbyshire.

Young made a single first-class appearance for Liverpool and District against Yorkshire in 1891 at Aigburth Cricket Ground, Liverpool. In a match which Liverpool and District won by 54 runs, Young batted twice, ending Liverpool and District's first-innings not out on 21, while in their second-innings he was dismissed for a duck by Bobby Peel.

He died at the town of his birth on 6 October 1933.
