= William Ramsay Young =

Australian soldier

William Ramsay Young (13 July 1894 – 9 January 1965) was an Australian soldier. Young was born in Coatbridge, Lanarkshire (Lanark), Scotland and died in Daw Park, Adelaide, South Australia.
