= William Gordon Young =

William Gordon Young (15 June 1904 – 6 September 1974) was an Australian physical culturist and public servant. Young was born in Guelph, Ontario, Canada and died in Marrickville, Sydney, New South Wales.
