= Webb Gallery =

Coordinates: 44°22′32.8″N 73°13′48.7″W

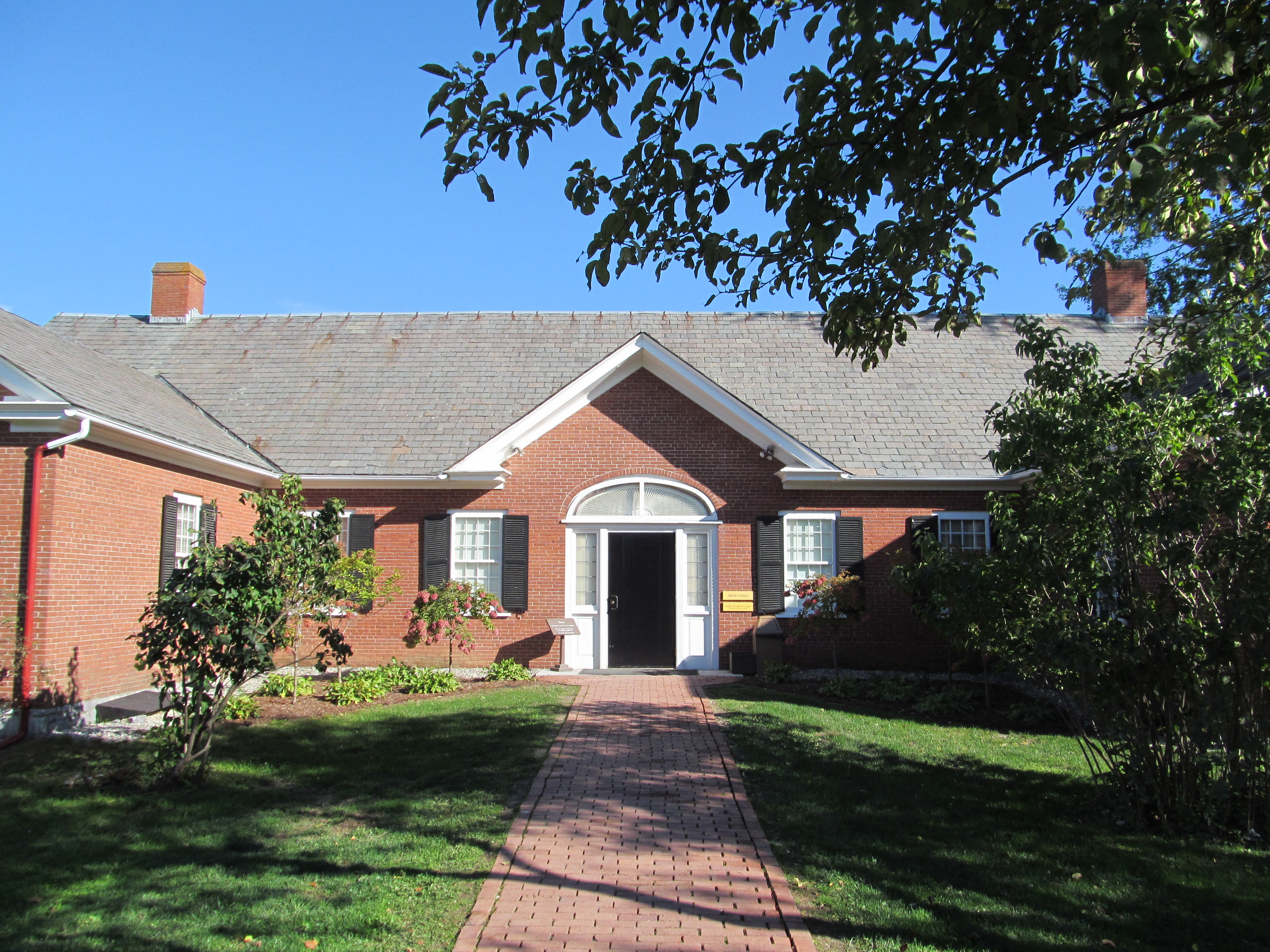
Webb Gallery

The Webb Gallery is an exhibit building located at the Shelburne Museum in Shelburne, Vermont. Webb Gallery is the Museum's primary showcase for American art and serves as a gallery for special exhibitions.

== History ==
The Shelburne Museum constructed Webb Gallery in 1960 and designed the building to mimic the facades of its neighboring historic structures. Webb Gallery’s footprint, with a central gable and two flanking wings, echoes the symmetry and scale of adjacent The Dorset House, while the red brick exterior, reflects the texture and color of nearby Vergennes Schoolhouse and The Charlotte Meeting House. Despite the historic references, behind the old-fashioned façade Webb Gallery possesses a modern truss-roof and technological systems that provide the proper environment for the preservation of artwork.

== Collection ==
=== American Paintings ===
Shelburne's extensive collection of 19th-century American paintings features Hudson River School landscapes, Luminist seascapes, portraits, still lifes, and genre scenes. Artists include Thomas Cole, John Kensett, Albert Bierstadt, Martin Johnson Heade, Fitz Hugh Lane, John Singleton Copley, William Merritt Chase, John Peto, Winslow Homer, Eastman Johnson, and John Quidor.

20th-century paintings include work by Grandma Moses, Carl Rungius, and Andrew Wyeth. Wyeth's Soaring is on view in Webb Gallery.
