= Dr. William D. Young Memorial =

Memorial drinking fountain in Toronto, Canada

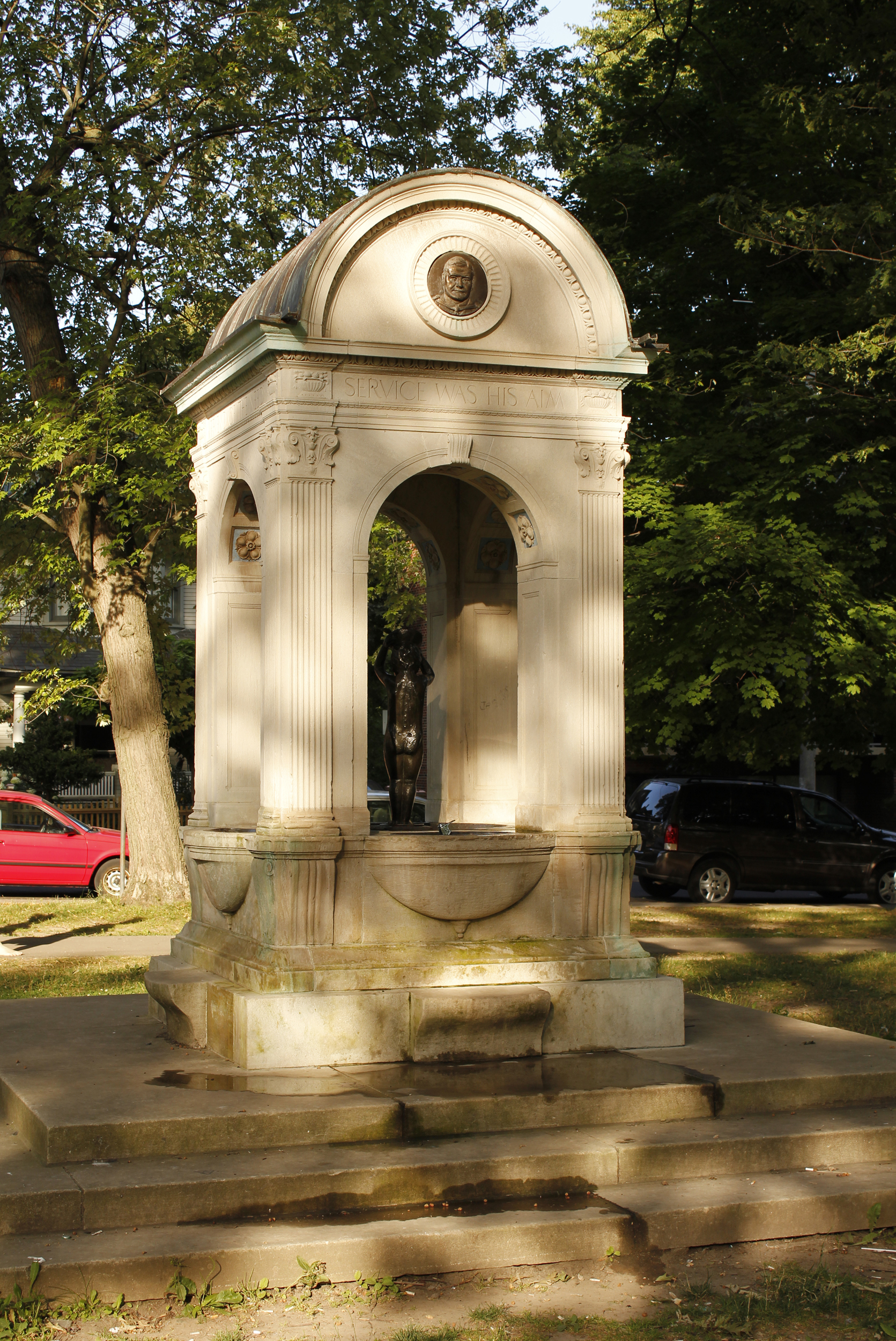
- Interactive map of Dr. William D. Young Memorial
- Location: Kew Gardens, The Beaches, Toronto
- Coordinates: 43°40′09″N 79°17′52″W
- Material: stone, bronze
- Completion date: August 1920
- Dedicated to: Dr. William D. Young

Ontario Heritage Act
- Type: Municipally-designated property of cultural heritage value or interest
- Designated: 1977

The Dr. William D. Young Memorial is a drinking fountain and memorial that was erected on the eastern border of Kew Gardens in Toronto, Ontario, Canada in August 1920 by residents of the Beaches neighbourhood.

The memorial was dedicated to Dr. William D. Young (1874-1918), a local physician who, in the era before universal health care, had devoted himself to the health and welfare of children of the neighbourhood. Young died after being stricken with influenza while tending to the sick during the Spanish flu pandemic of 1918. He died almost penniless after his pro bono work with local children.

The Italian Renaissance-style memorial was designed by M.D. Klein, and originally contained a statue of a child by Florence Wyle, later replaced by one by Frances Gage. Ivor Lewis designed the medallions of Dr. Young. The words "Service Was His Aim" are inscribed at the top of the memorial.

The City of Toronto designated the memorial under the Ontario Heritage Act in 1977. The designation by-law states:

The William D. Young Memorial Drinking Fountain, Kew Gardens, 1920 (Architect and Designer Morris D, Klein) is designated on architectural and historic grounds.

The elegantly designed fountain in the Italian Renaissance style displays the finest of craftmanship in stone and bronze. Erected in 1920 through public subscription, the Memorial Drinking Fountain symbolizes the philanthropic service of a distinguished doctor in the Beaches district at the turn of the Century.
