= Sidney Goodwin (artist) =

Paul Sidney Goodwin (28 January 1875 – 23 September 1944), commonly known as Sidney Goodwin, was an English/Australian artist who painted primarily in watercolour. When he emigrated to Australia he adopted the pseudonym William Young.

== Biography ==
Goodwin was born in Southampton, England on 28 January 1875. He was the elder son of the six children born to William Sidney Goodwin and his wife Elizabeth (nee Young). His talented family produced several artists, most notably Sidney's uncle Albert Goodwin.

Typically, Goodwin painted urban, rural and maritime landscapes and he was known as an accomplished painter of animals, particularly horses. Like his father and uncle before him, he was an avid traveller and made regular overseas trips which included extended visits to Canada and Ireland. Despite travelling for long periods each year he was nonetheless a regular exhibitor with the Southampton Art Society (SAS), Bournemouth Art Society and Royal Hibernian Academy of Arts in Dublin. He commenced exhibiting with the SAS’s Fourth Annual Exhibition in 1889 when only fourteen years old.

After WWI Goodwin departed the northern hemisphere emigrating to Australia where he stayed for the remainder of his life. On arrival in Sydney he adopted the pseudonym William Young and his Australian paintings, which date from 1919, were signed "W. Young". It is unclear what circumstances prompted his relocation and change of name.

He died in Sydney on 23 September 1944 and is represented in the collections of the Southampton City Art Gallery, Maidstone Museum & Bentlif Art Gallery, Mitchell Library, State Library of New South Wales, Wollongong Art Gallery and New England Regional Art Museum.

== Gallery ==
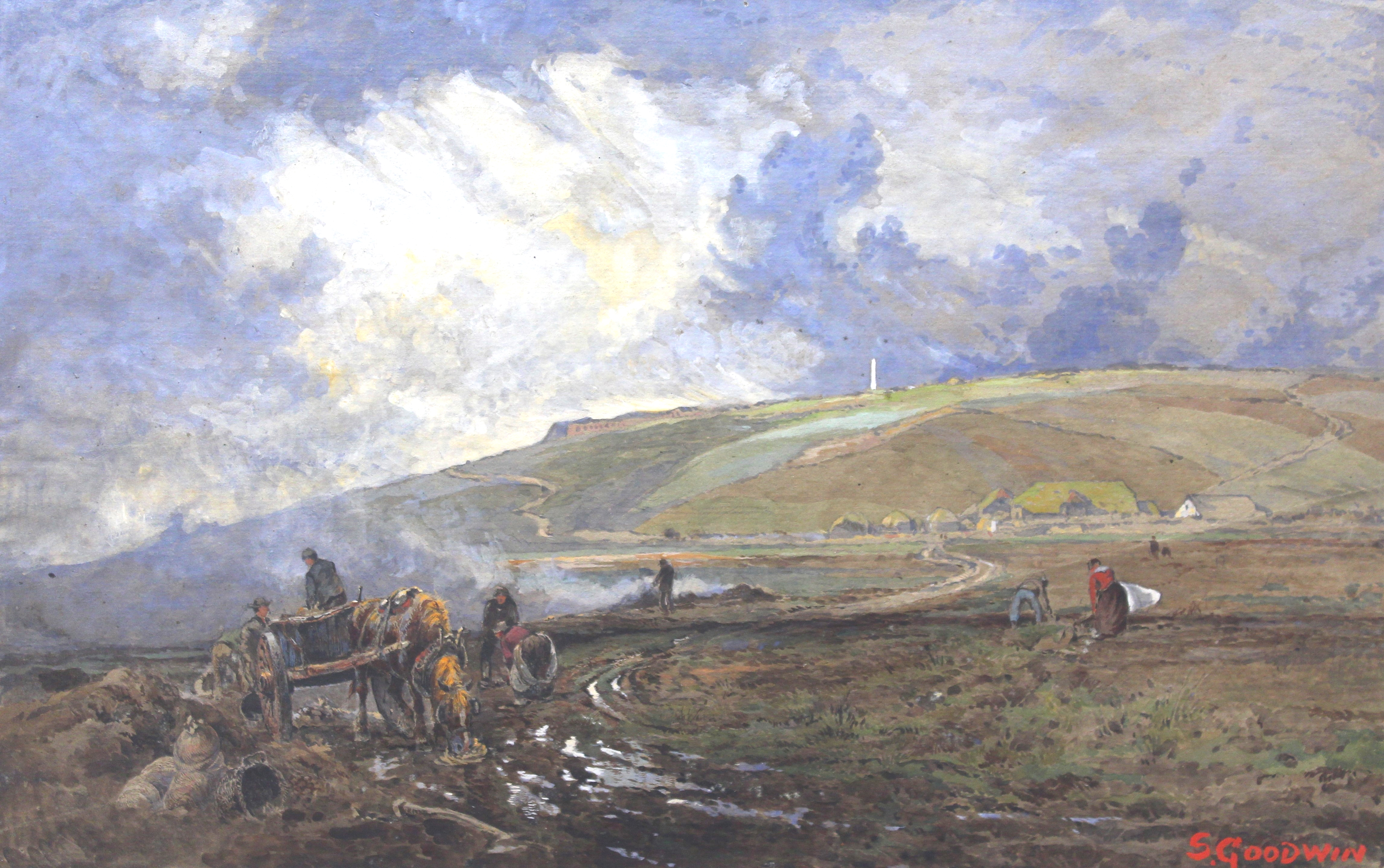
After the Harvest by Sidney Goodwin.

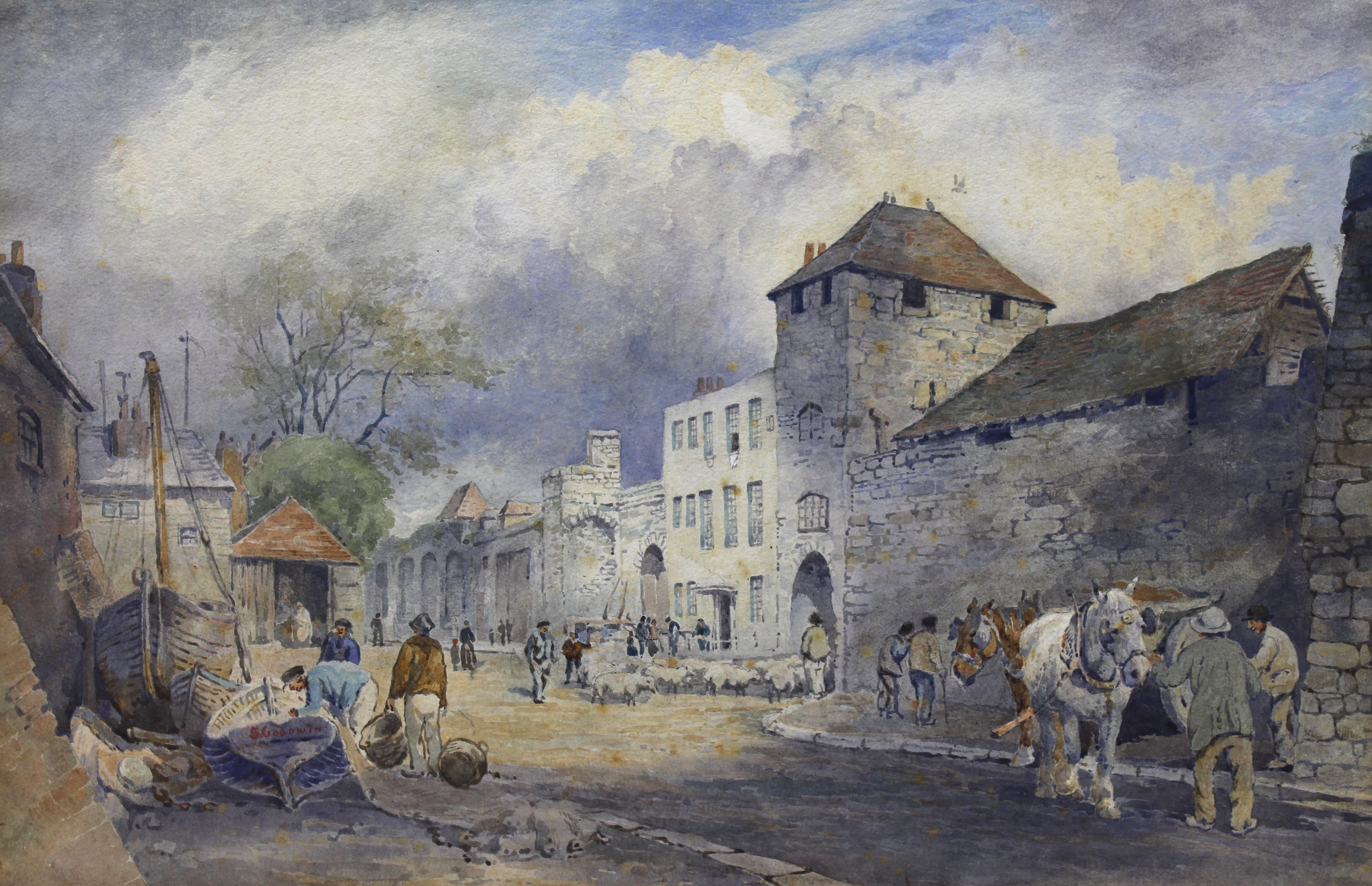
A Bit of Old Southampton by Sidney Goodwin.

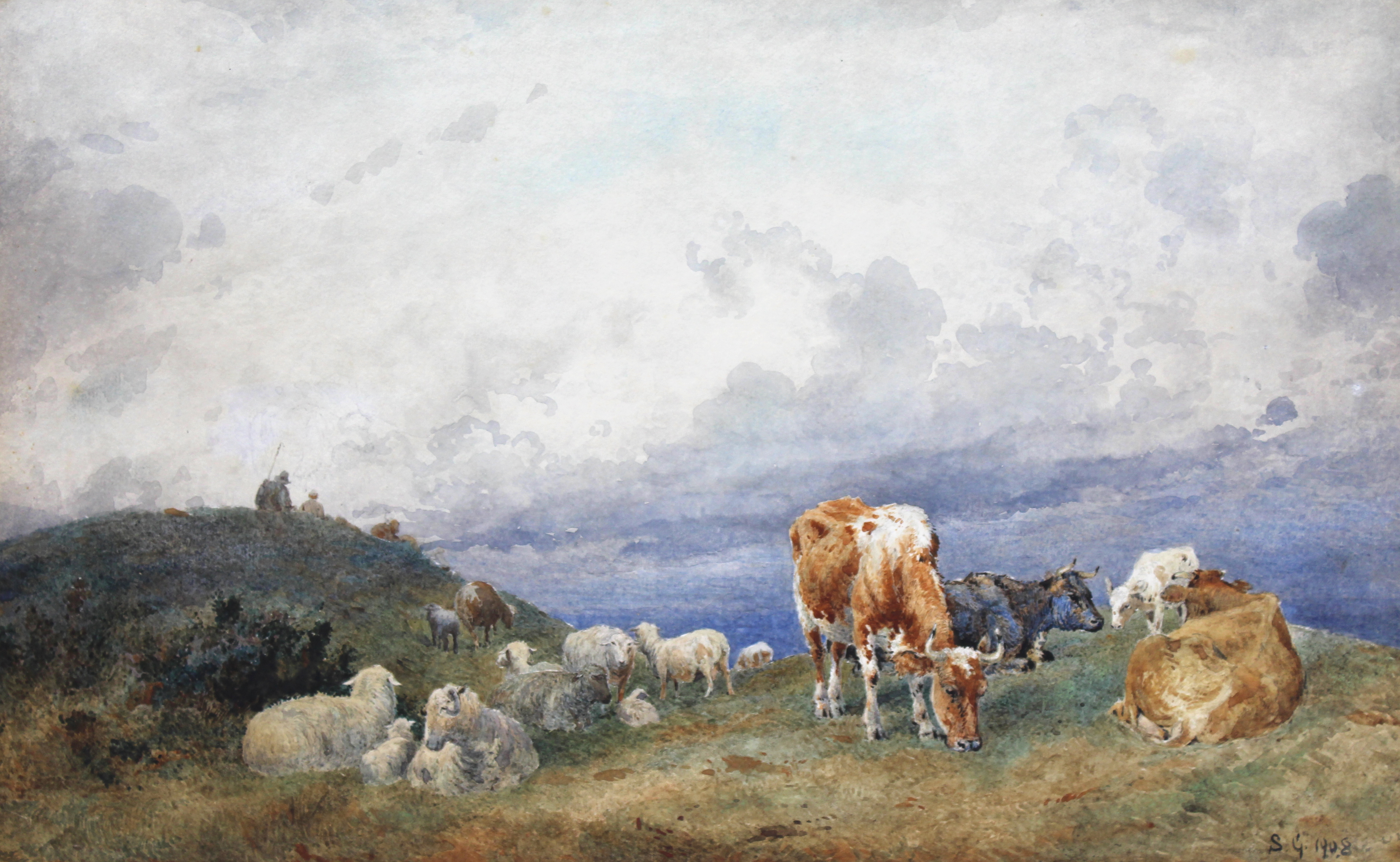
Near Netley (1908) by Sidney Goodwin.

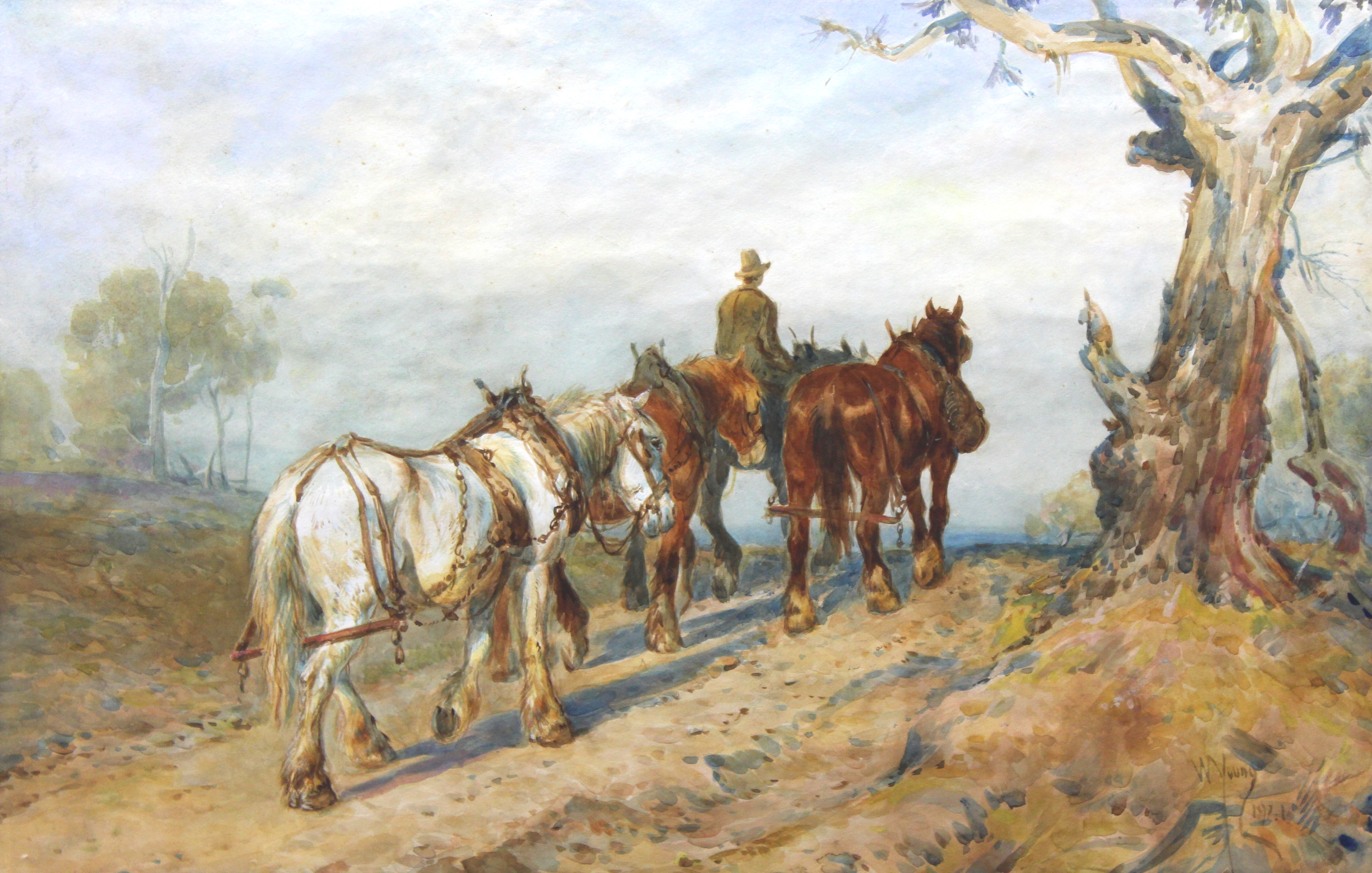
On the Road Home (1921) by William Young.

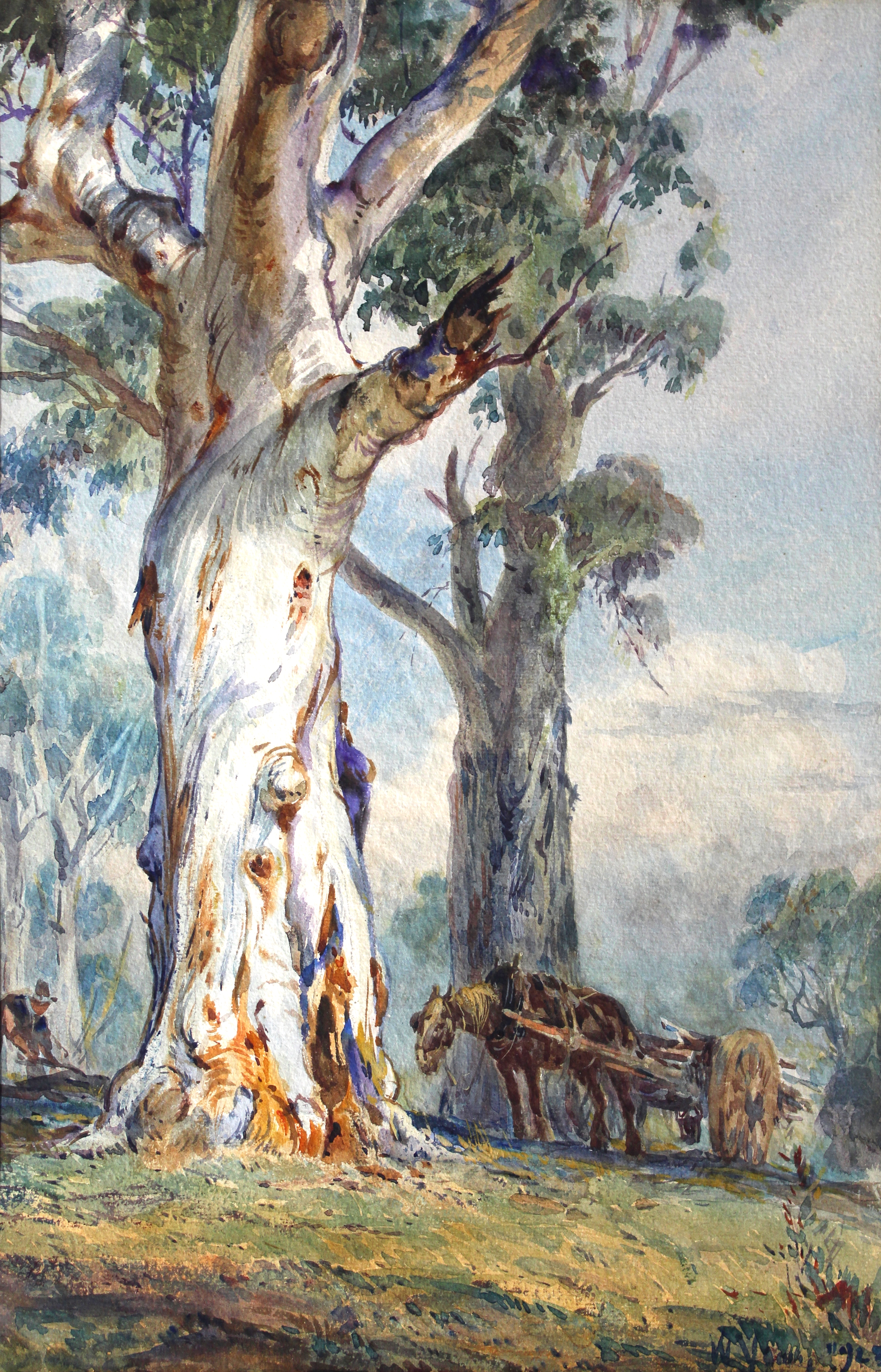
Collecting Wood (1923) by William Young.

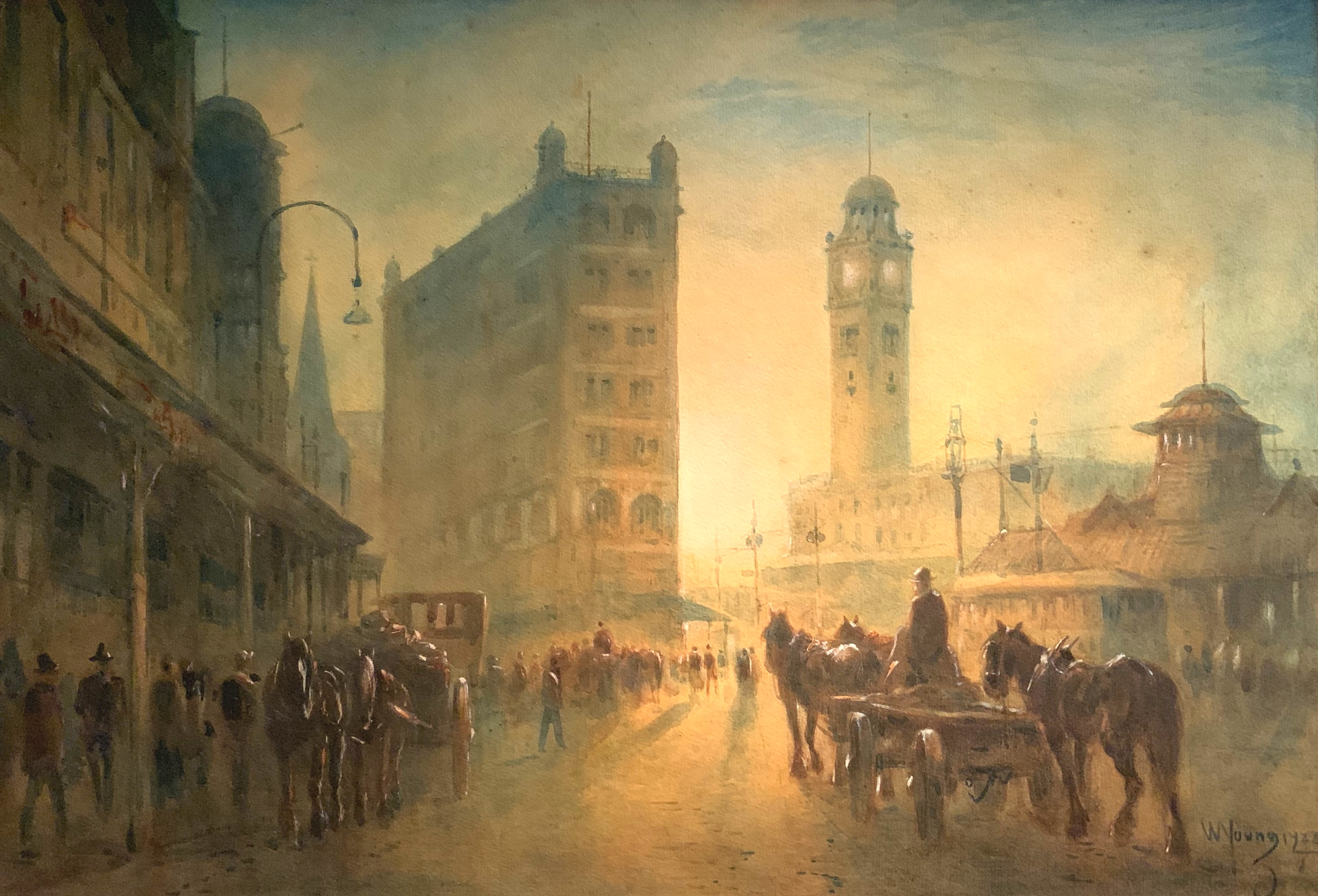
Central Station, Sydney (1923) by William Young.
