= W. J. Young =

This is about the Irish businessman. For the college basketball coach, go to William J. Young (coach).

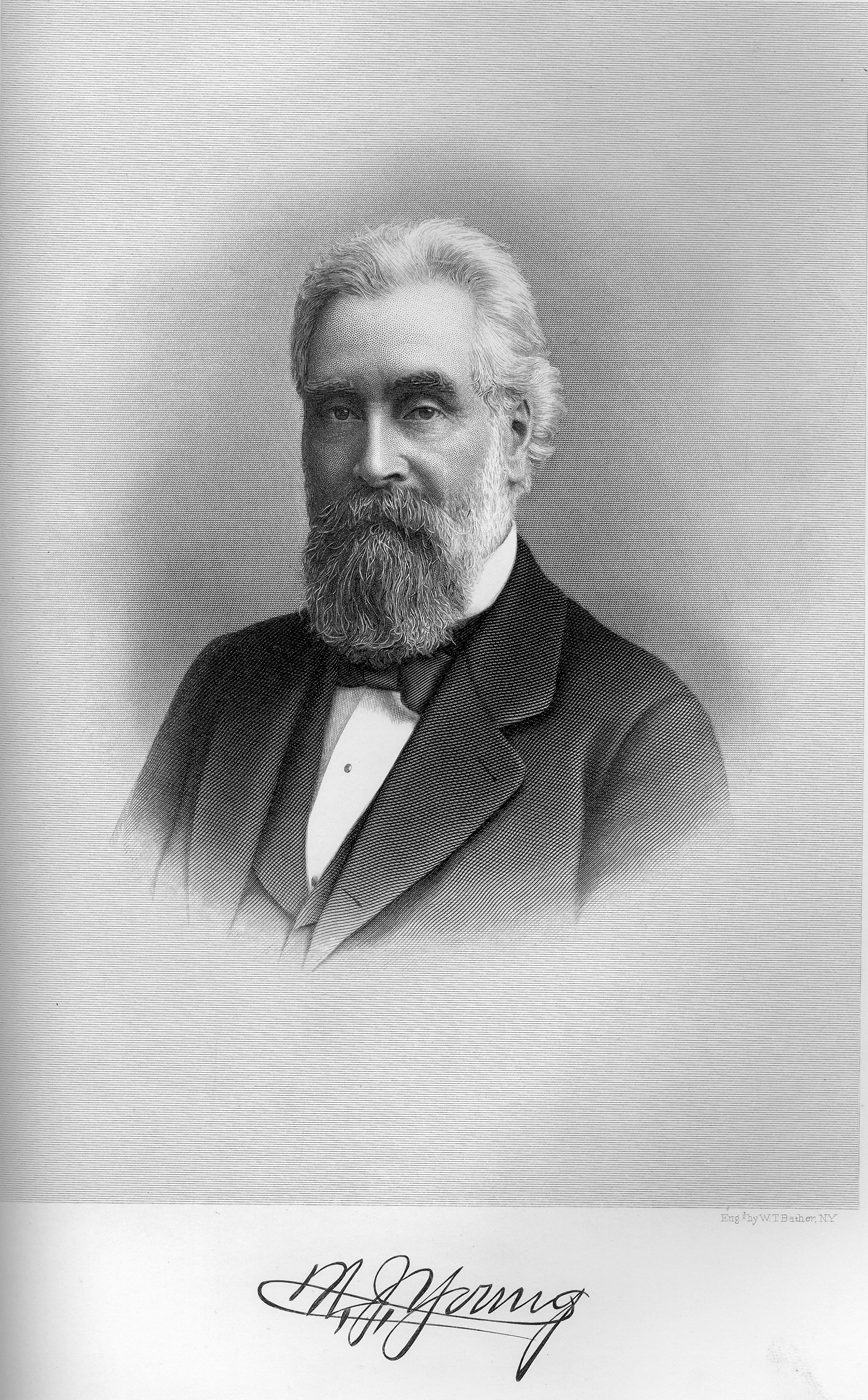

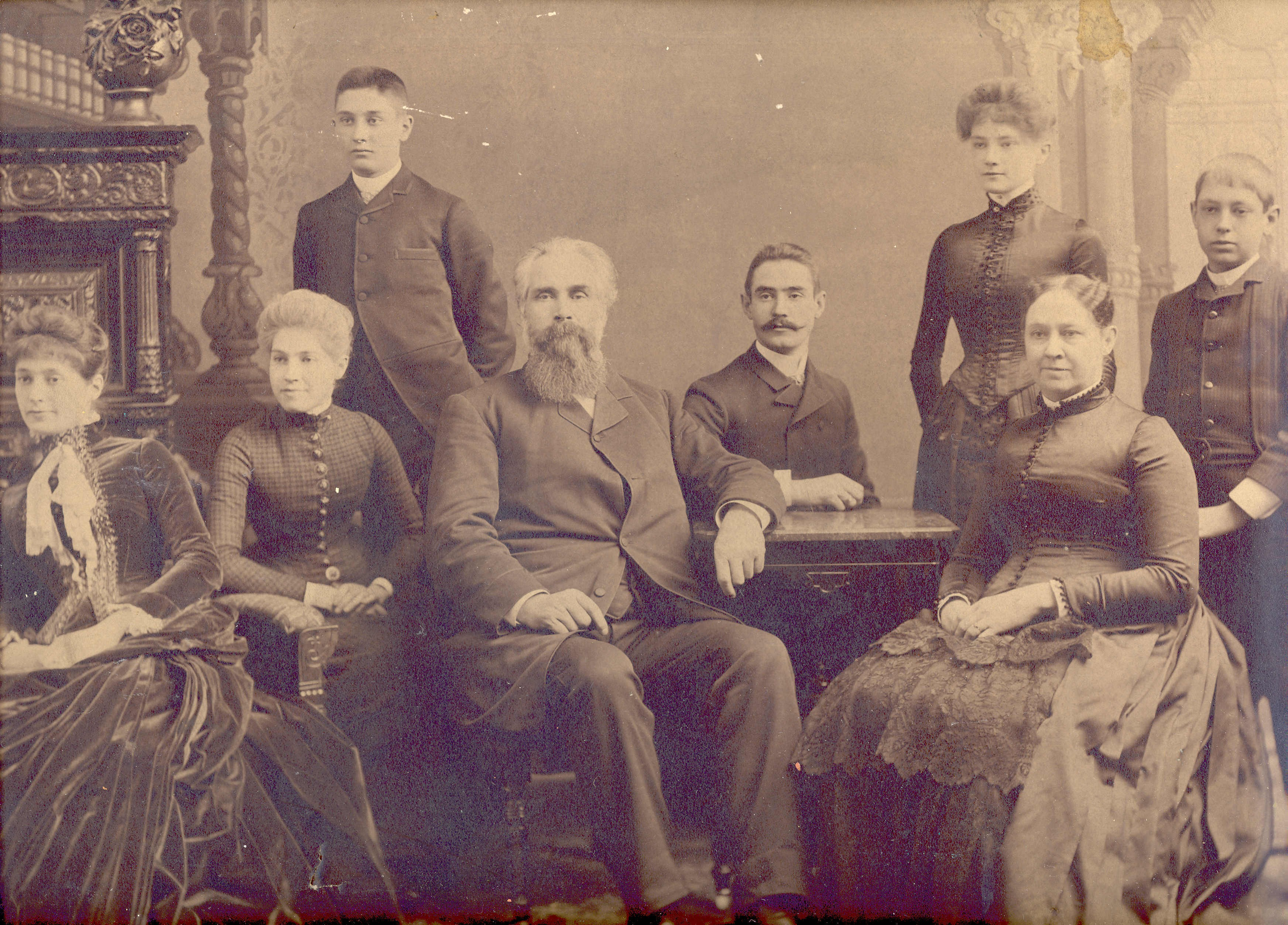
W.J. Young family

William John Young (February 27, 1827 at Belfast, Ireland – June 8, 1896 at Clinton, Iowa) was the founder of the W.J. Young Company. He revolutionized the slow system of rafting logs by floatage with the current of the river in 1865 by a successful experiment of pushing log rafts ahead of a steam boat, independent of the river currents, and this with his introduction of the system of brail rafting, facilitated the movement of log stock while greatly lessening the expense of delivering them from the booms at Reef Slough and other points, to the mills at various points on the lower river; but for these advantages, the work of the mills would never have reached the vast volume to which they soon attained. Mr. Young was one of the original members of the Mississippi River Logging Company, his interest in which he sold in 1893, after being for many years one of the most active and influential members of the company.

== Family ==
He married Miss Esther Elderkin of Richmond, Indiana in 1858. They had six children.

== Early business years ==
Young came to America in 1846. For several years he was employed in railroad offices and in ten years was given the position of general freight agent of the Cincinnati, Logansport & Chicago railroad. In 1858, he settled at Clinton, Iowa, and helped open a lumberyard for the Ohio Mill Company.

== Building his lumber business ==
The machinery proved the nucleus of the vast mills and business, which but a few years later, brought Mr. Young's name and extensive operations into a prominence. In 1860 a new mill was erected, which commenced operations in August. In the statistical reports for 1873 the record shows there were two mills, built in 1867, with an estimated capacity of 50,000,000 board feet (100,000 m^{3}) yearly, operating two rotaries, eight gangs and five double edgers, employing 300 operators;. The cut of 1874 is stated at 29,665,000 board feet (70,000 m^{3}) of lumber and 17,295,000 shingles, that of 1875 being 35,218,000 board feet (83,110 m^{3}) of lumber and 14,470,000 shingles, showing a rapid evolution from the original mill of up to 8,000 board feet (20 m^{3}) per day while much larger, proved inadequate to the growing demands of his rapidly expanding operations. In twenty years, Mr. Young had become proprietor of the largest saw mill in operation on the American continent. In his earlier venture, the two Cincinnati men who had been connected with the La Crosse mill, and in whose interest it was removed to Clinton, were partners in the firm known as "W.J. Young & Co.," but a few years later Mr. Young purchased their interests, and formed a connection with John McGraw of Ithaca, New York, who was a member of the firm of Sage & McGraw of Albany, New York and one of the largest lumbermen of the Allegheny region, and with large mills at Saginaw, and at Belle Ewart, Canada, and in connection with him purchased much of the land of the Cornell University of Ithaca, which had been donated by the State of New York from a large grant of Wisconsin lands donated by the general government in aid of its school fund, and which comprised some of the best pine land of Wisconsin. Under this arrangement the firm name of W.J. Young & Co. was continued until the death of Mr. McGraw, as well as of his daughter Jennie McGraw Fisk, his beneficiary, who died a few years later, when Mr. Young purchased the interest of the estate, and continued the firm name, although being the only party in interest.

== Later lumber business development ==
In 1880 the cut of Mr. Young's mills reached 50,000,000 board feet (100,000 m^{3}) of lumber and 20,000,000 shingles, of which 18,000,000 board feet (40,000 m^{3}) of lumber and 8,000,000 shingles was at the close of the season in pile on his yard, for the supply of his now greatly expanded trade, being seasoned before shipment over a vast territory extending in all directions. In 1882, W. J. Young & Company became a corporation.

The mills of 1892 reported a cut of 90,234,156 board feet (212,928.90 m^{3}) of lumber and 39,144,750 shingles, with a stock on hand at the close of the season of 47,000,000 board feet (110,000 m^{3}) of lumber and 16,600,000 shingles, and at this time no mill in the world could vie with the "big mill" of Mr. Young. Mr. Young was an invalid from 1893 to his death in 1896, the mills did not operate in 1895-6, and were subsequently run to be a modicum of their capacity, the cut of 1897 being recorded at but 10,000,000 board feet (20,000 m^{3}) of lumber, 2,000,000 shingles and 1,500,000 lath, a conservative estimate placing the total production since 1858 at 1,700,000,000 board feet (4,000,000 m^{3}) of lumber and 750,000,000 shingles.

== Other activities ==
Mr. Young was active in banking. He erected and presented to the Methodist denomination at Clinton, the beautiful "Esther Young Chapel." He purchased and presented to the Young Men's Christian Association of Clinton a beautiful building. His interest in educational matters was manifested also in liberal gifts to Cornell College at Mount Vernon, Iowa.

He cared little for political honors, but in 1864 yielded to the almost unanimous call of the citizens of Clinton that he should take the mayoralty and the affairs of the city thrived under his administration. He was for some time president of the Clinton Savings Bank, was a director of the Clinton National bank.
