= William John Young (pastoralist) =

William John Young (20 October 1850 – 1 June 1931) was an Australian company chief executive and station manager. Young was born in Belfast, Ireland and died in Darling Point, Sydney, New South Wales.
