= The Black Dwarf (newspaper) =

1968-72 British periodical

- June 1968 issue of Black Dwarf
- Editor: Tariq Ali (until March 1970)
- Founded: May 1968
- Ceased publication: September 1970

The Black Dwarf was a political and cultural newspaper published between May 1968 and 1970 by a collective of socialists in the United Kingdom. It is often identified with Tariq Ali who edited and published the newspaper until 1970, when the editorial board split between Leninist and non-Leninist currents.

Black Dwarf took its name from the nineteenth-century radical paper of that name which was published from 1817 to 1824.

The editorial and production group included Ali, Clive Goodwin, Anthony Barnett, Robin Fior, David Mercer, Mo Teitlebaum, Douglas Gill, Adrian Mitchell, Sheila Rowbotham, Bob Rowthorn, D. A. N. Jones, Sean Thompson, Neil Lyndon, Roger Tyrrell and Fred Halliday.

The Leninists, including Ali and other members of the International Marxist Group, went on to found the Red Mole in March 1970. Black Dwarf continued, with Anthony Barnett as the principal editor, until September 1970. He subsequently helped to establish 7 Days.

The Black Dwarf newspaper published a special edition in autumn 1968 devoted entirely to the Bolivian Diaries of Che Guevara, in a translation first published by Ramparts in the United States. It included an introduction by Fidel Castro. This edition appeared to be in response to a version of the diaries put out by "some publishers in league with those who murdered Che".

John Hoyland and the musician John Lennon of the Beatles had an exchange of letters in the newspaper regarding Lennon's supposed bourgeois values. Hoyland in "An Open Letter to John Lennon", ostensibly a review of the Beatles recent eponymous white album, wrote that Lennon's song "Revolution" was no more revolutionary than Mrs Dale's Diary and that "In order to change the world we've got to understand what's wrong with the world then destroy it ruthlessly.... There's no such thing as a polite revolution." Lennon replied, writing: "...You're obviously on a destruction kick. I'll tell you what's wrong with the world – people, so do you want to destroy them? Ruthlessly? Until we change your/our heads – there's no chance...". Lennon wrote in a postscript: "You smash it – I'll build around it".

== See also ==
- List of underground newspapers of the 1960s counterculture
