= Externality =

Imposed cost or benefit in economics

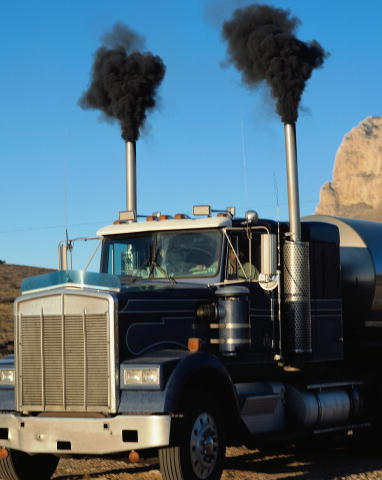
Air pollution from motor vehicles is an example of a negative externality. The costs of the air pollution for the rest of society is not compensated for by either the producers or users of motorized transport.

In economics, an externality is a cost or benefit to an uninvolved third party that arises as an effect of another party's (or parties') activity. Many externalities can be considered as unpriced components that are involved in either consumer or producer consumption. Air pollution from motor vehicles is one example. The cost of air pollution to society is not paid by either the producers or users of motorized transport. Water pollution from mills and factories are another example. All (water) consumers are made worse off by pollution but are not compensated by the market for this damage.

The concept of externality was first developed by Alfred Marshall in the 1890s and achieved broader attention in the works of economist Arthur Pigou in the 1920s. The prototypical example of a negative externality is environmental pollution. Pigou argued that a tax, equal to the marginal damage or marginal external cost, (later called a "Pigouvian tax") on negative externalities could be used to reduce their incidence to an efficient level. Subsequent thinkers have debated whether it is preferable to tax or to regulate negative externalities, the optimally efficient level of the Pigouvian taxation, and what factors cause or exacerbate negative externalities, such as providing investors in corporations with limited liability for harms committed by the corporation.

Externalities often occur when the production or consumption of a product or service's private price equilibrium cannot reflect the true costs or benefits of that product or service for society as a whole. This causes the externality competitive equilibrium to not adhere to the condition of Pareto optimality. Thus, since resources can be better allocated, externalities are an example of market failure.

Externalities can be either positive or negative. Governments and institutions often take actions to internalize externalities, thus market-priced transactions can incorporate all the benefits and costs associated with transactions between economic agents. The most common way this is done is by imposing taxes on the producers of the externality. However, since regulators do not always have all the information on the externality, it can be difficult to impose the right tax. Once the externality is internalized through a tax, the competitive equilibrium is Pareto optimal.

== History of the concept ==
The term "externality" was first coined by the British economist Alfred Marshall in his seminal work, "Principles of Economics," published in 1890. Marshall introduced the concept to elucidate the effects of production and consumption activities that extend beyond the immediate parties involved in a transaction. Marshall's formulation of externalities laid the groundwork for subsequent scholarly inquiry into the broader societal impacts of economic actions. While Marshall provided the initial conceptual framework for externalities, it was Arthur Pigou, a British economist, who further developed the concept in his influential work, "The Economics of Welfare," published in 1920. Pigou expanded upon Marshall's ideas and introduced the concept of "Pigovian taxes" or corrective taxes aimed at internalizing externalities by aligning private costs with social costs. His work emphasized the role of government intervention in addressing market failures resulting from externalities.

Additionally, the American economist Frank Knight contributed to the understanding of externalities through his writings on social costs and benefits in the 1920s and 1930s. Knight's work highlighted the inherent challenges in quantifying and mitigating externalities within market systems, underscoring the complexities involved in achieving optimal resource allocation. Throughout the 20th century, the concept of externalities continued to evolve with advancements in economic theory and empirical research. Scholars such as Ronald Coase and Harold Hotelling made significant contributions to the understanding of externalities and their implications for market efficiency and welfare.

The recognition of externalities as a pervasive phenomenon with wide-ranging implications has led to its incorporation into various fields beyond economics, including environmental science, public health, and urban planning. Contemporary debates surrounding issues such as climate change, pollution, and resource depletion underscore the enduring relevance of the concept of externalities in addressing pressing societal challenges.

== Definitions ==
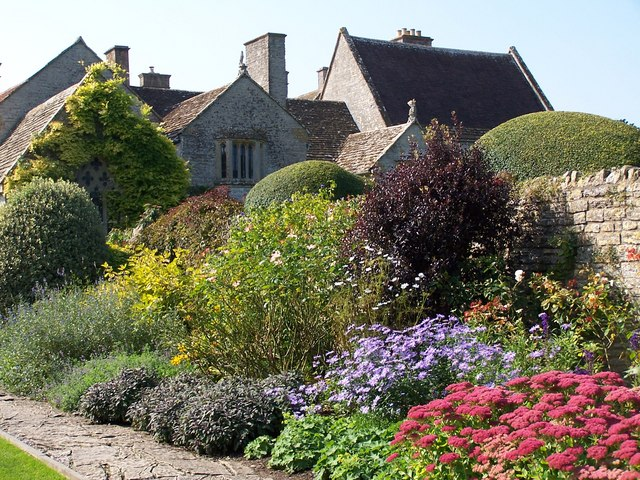
The neighbors who live beside this house and garden get to enjoy the view of the beautiful flowers at no cost.

A negative externality is any difference between the private cost of an action or decision to an economic agent and the social cost. In simple terms, a negative externality is anything that causes an indirect cost to individuals. An example is the toxic gases that are released from industries or mines, these gases cause harm to individuals within the surrounding area and have to bear a cost (indirect cost) to get rid of that harm. Conversely, a positive externality is any difference between the private benefit of an action or decision to an economic agent and the social benefit. A positive externality is anything that causes an indirect benefit to individuals and for which the producer of that positive externality is not compensated. For example, planting trees makes individuals' property look nicer and it also cleans the surrounding areas.

In microeconomic theory, externalities are factored into competitive equilibrium analysis as the social effect, as opposed to the private market which only factors direct economic effects. The social effect of economic activity is the sum of the indirect (the externalities) and direct factors. The Pareto optimum, therefore, is at the levels in which the social marginal benefit equals the social marginal cost.

== Implications ==
A voluntary exchange may reduce societal welfare if external costs exist. The person who is affected by the negative externalities in the case of air pollution will see it as lowered utility: either subjective displeasure or potentially explicit costs, such as higher medical expenses. The externality may even be seen as a trespass on their health or violating their property rights (by reduced valuation). Thus, an external cost may pose an ethical or political problem. Negative externalities are Pareto inefficient, and since Pareto efficiency underpins the justification for private property, they undermine the whole idea of a market economy. For these reasons, negative externalities are more problematic than positive externalities.

Although positive externalities may appear to be beneficial, while Pareto efficient, they still represent a failure in the market as it results in the production of the good falling under what is optimal for the market. By allowing producers to recognise and attempt to control their externalities production would increase as they would have motivation to do so. With this comes the free rider problem. The free rider problem arises when people overuse a shared resource without doing their part to produce or pay for it. It represents a failure in the market where goods and services are not able to be distributed efficiently, allowing people to take more than what is fair. For example, if a farmer has honeybees a positive externality of owning these bees is that they will also pollinate the surrounding plants. This farmer has a next door neighbour who also benefits from this externality even though he does not have any bees himself. From the perspective of the neighbour he has no incentive to purchase bees himself as he is already benefiting from them at zero cost. But for the farmer, he is missing out on the full benefits of his own bees which he paid for, because they are also being used by his neighbour.

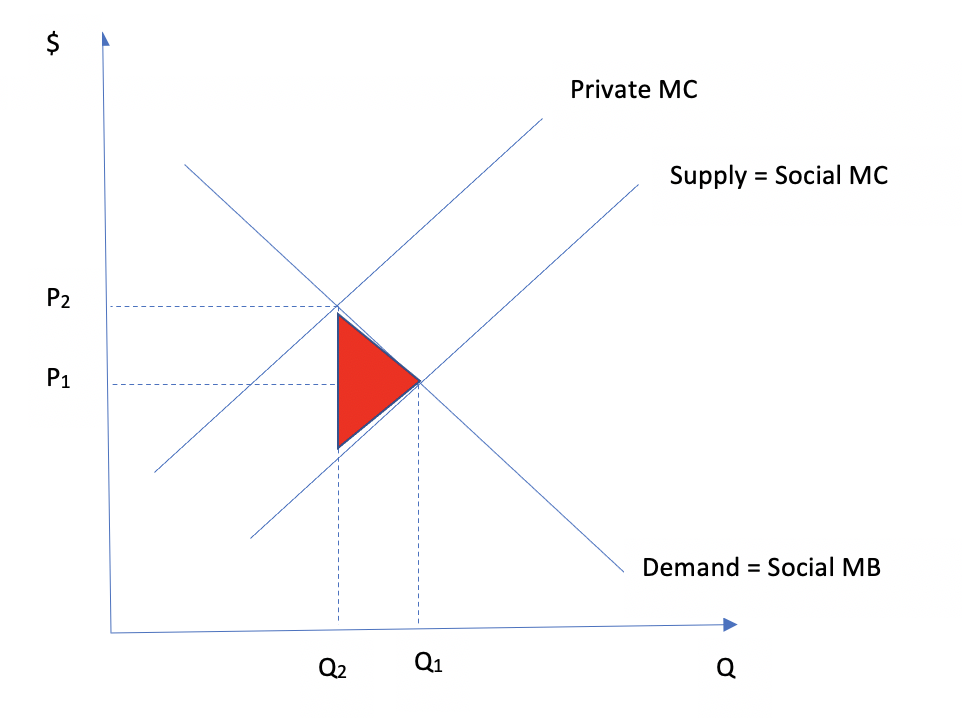
Graph of positive externality in production

There are a number of theoretical means of improving overall social utility when negative externalities are involved. The market-driven approach to correcting externalities is to internalize third party costs and benefits, for example, by requiring a polluter to repair any damage caused. But in many cases, internalizing costs or benefits is not feasible, especially if the true monetary values cannot be determined.

Laissez-faire economists such as Friedrich Hayek and Milton Friedman sometimes refer to externalities as "neighborhood effects" or "spillovers", although externalities are not necessarily minor or localized. Similarly, Ludwig von Mises argues that externalities arise from lack of "clear personal property definition."

== Examples ==
Many externalities arise between producers, between consumers or between consumers and producers. Externalities can be negative when the action of one party imposes costs on another, or positive when the action of one party benefits another.

Classification of externalities
	Consumption	Production
Negative	Negative externalities in consumption	Negative externalities in production
Positive	Positive externalities in consumption	Positive externalities in production

=== Negative ===
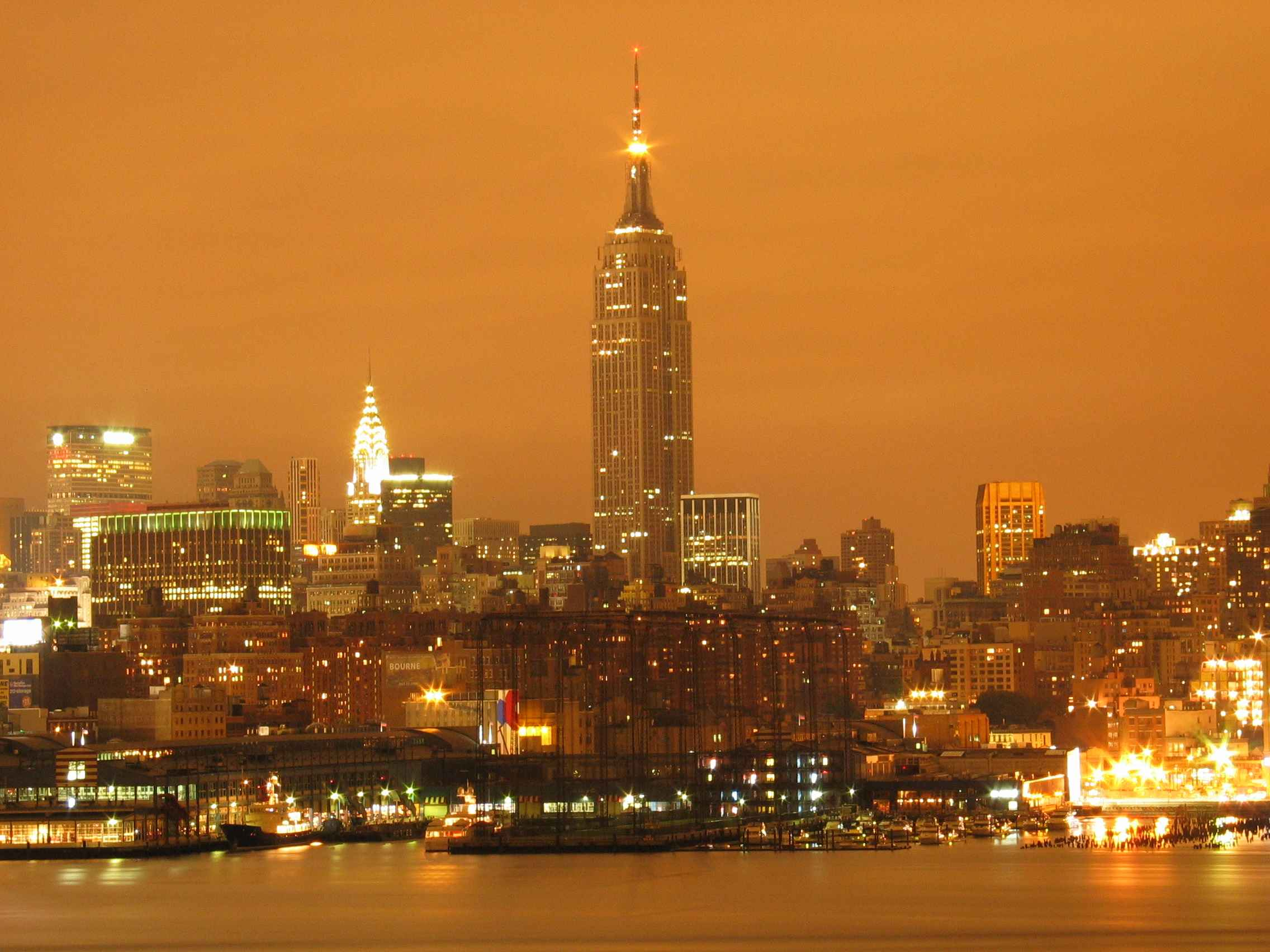
Light pollution is an example of an externality because the consumption of street lighting has an effect on bystanders that is not compensated for by the consumers of the lighting.

A negative externality (also called "external cost" or "external diseconomy") is an economic activity that imposes a negative effect on an unrelated third party, not captured by the market price. It can arise either during the production or the consumption of a good or service. Pollution is termed an externality because it imposes costs on people who are "external" to the producer and consumer of the polluting product. Barry Commoner commented on the costs of externalities:

Clearly, we have compiled a record of serious failures in recent technological encounters with the environment. In each case, the new technology was brought into use before the ultimate hazards were known. We have been quick to reap the benefits and slow to comprehend the costs.

Many negative externalities are related to the environmental consequences of production and use. The article on environmental economics also addresses externalities and how they may be addressed in the context of environmental issues.

"The corporation is an externalizing machine (moving its operating costs and risks to external organizations and people), in the same way that a shark is a killing machine." - Robert Monks (2003) Republican candidate for Senate from Maine and corporate governance adviser in the film "The Corporation".

==== Negative production externalities ====
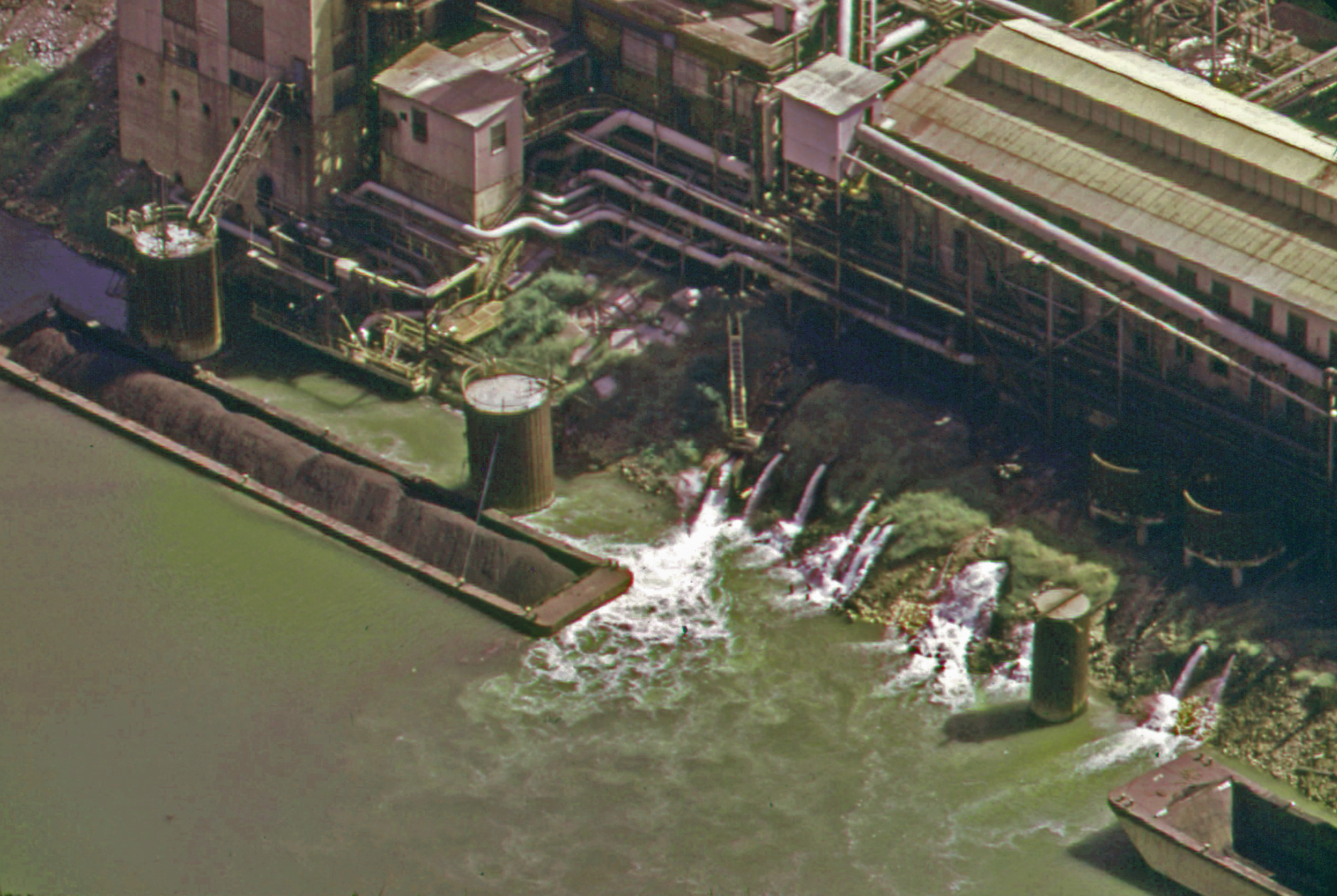
Effluent flows from industrial plants can pollute waterways.

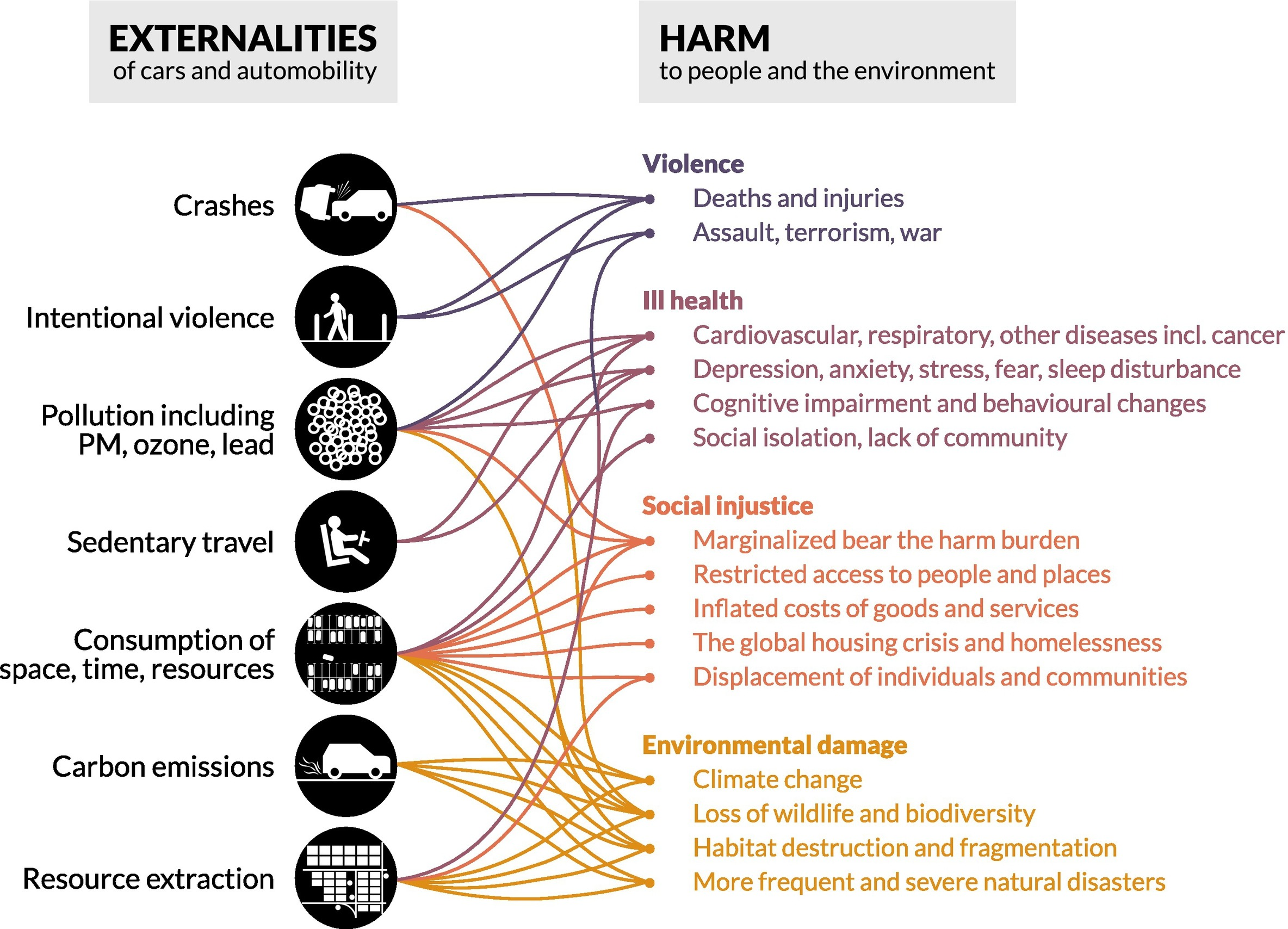
Diagram of the externalities of cars and automobility and their negative impacts

Examples for negative production externalities include:

- Air pollution from burning fossil fuels. This activity causes damages to crops, materials and (historic) buildings and public health.
- Anthropogenic climate change as a consequence of greenhouse gas emissions from the burning of fossil fuels and the rearing of livestock. The Stern Review on the Economics of Climate Change says "Climate change presents a unique challenge for economics: it is the greatest example of market failure we have ever seen."
- Water pollution from industrial effluents can harm plants, animals, and humans
- Spam emails during the sending of unsolicited messages by email.
- Government regulation: Any costs required to comply with a law, regulation, or policy, either in terms of time or money, that are not covered by the entity issuing the edict (see also unfunded mandate).
- Noise pollution during the production process, which may be mentally and psychologically disruptive.
- Systemic risk: the risks to the overall economy arising from the risks that the banking system takes. A condition of moral hazard can occur in the absence of well-designed banking regulation, or in the presence of badly designed regulation.
- Negative effects of Industrial farm animal production, including "the increase in the pool of antibiotic-resistant bacteria because of the overuse of antibiotics; air quality problems; the contamination of rivers, streams, and coastal waters with concentrated animal waste; animal welfare problems, mainly as a result of the extremely close quarters in which the animals are housed."
- The depletion of the stock of fish in the ocean due to overfishing. This is an example of a common property resource, which is vulnerable to the tragedy of the commons in the absence of appropriate environmental governance.
- In the United States, the cost of storing nuclear waste from nuclear plants for more than 1,000 years (over 100,000 for some types of nuclear waste) is, in principle, included in the cost of the electricity the plant produces in the form of a fee paid to the government and held in the nuclear waste superfund, although much of that fund was spent on Yucca Mountain nuclear waste repository without producing a solution. Conversely, the costs of managing the long-term risks of disposal of chemicals, which may remain hazardous on similar time scales, is not commonly internalized in prices. The USEPA regulates chemicals for periods ranging from 100 years to a maximum of 10,000 years.

==== Negative consumption externalities ====
Examples of negative consumption externalities include:

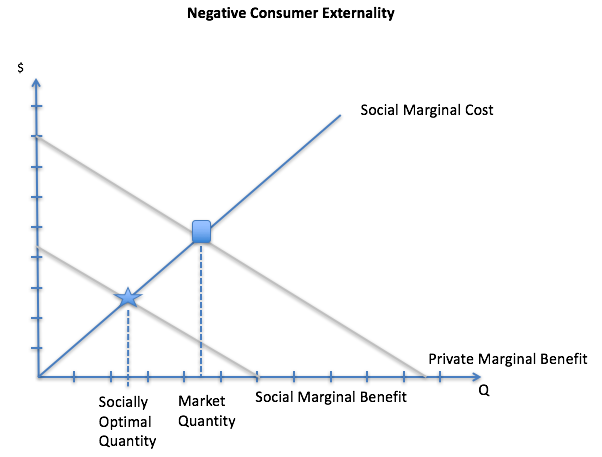
Negative consumption externality

- Noise pollution: Sleep deprivation due to a neighbor listening to loud music late at night.
- Antibiotic resistance, caused by increased usage of antibiotics: Individuals do not consider this efficacy cost when making usage decisions. Government policies proposed to preserve future antibiotic effectiveness include educational campaigns, regulation, Pigouvian taxes, and patents.
- Passive smoking: Shared costs of declining health and vitality caused by smoking or alcohol abuse. Here, the "cost" is that of providing minimum social welfare. Economists more frequently attribute this problem to the category of moral hazards, the prospect that parties insulated from risk may behave differently from the way they would if they were fully exposed to the risk. For example, individuals with insurance against automobile theft may be less vigilant about locking their cars, because the negative consequences of automobile theft are (partially) borne by the insurance company.
- Traffic congestion: When more people use public roads, road users experience congestion costs such as more waiting in traffic and longer trip times. Increased road users also increase the likelihood of road accidents.
- Price increases: Consumption by one party causes prices to rise and therefore makes other consumers worse off, perhaps by preventing, reducing or delaying their consumption. These effects are sometimes called "pecuniary externalities" and are distinguished from "real externalities" or "technological externalities". Pecuniary externalities appear to be externalities, but occur within the market mechanism and are not considered to be a source of market failure or inefficiency, although they may still result in substantial harm to others.
- Weak public infrastructure, air pollution, climate change, work misallocation, resource requirements and land/space requirements as in the externalities of automobiles.

==== Negative externalities outside production and consumption ====
Some negative externalities involve neither production nor consumption. One such externality is the spread of infectious diseases to others resulting from one's exercising the right to decline preventive or therapeutic medical care. A specific example is when vaccine hesitancy prevents or undoes the attainment of population immunity and thus leads to outbreaks.

=== Positive ===
A positive externality (also called "external benefit" or "external economy" or "beneficial externality") is the positive effect an activity imposes on an unrelated third party. Similar to a negative externality, it can arise either on the production side, or on the consumption side.

A positive production externality occurs when a firm's production increases the well-being of others but the firm is uncompensated by those others, while a positive consumption externality occurs when an individual's consumption benefits other but the individual is uncompensated by those others.

==== Positive production externalities ====
Examples of positive production externalities

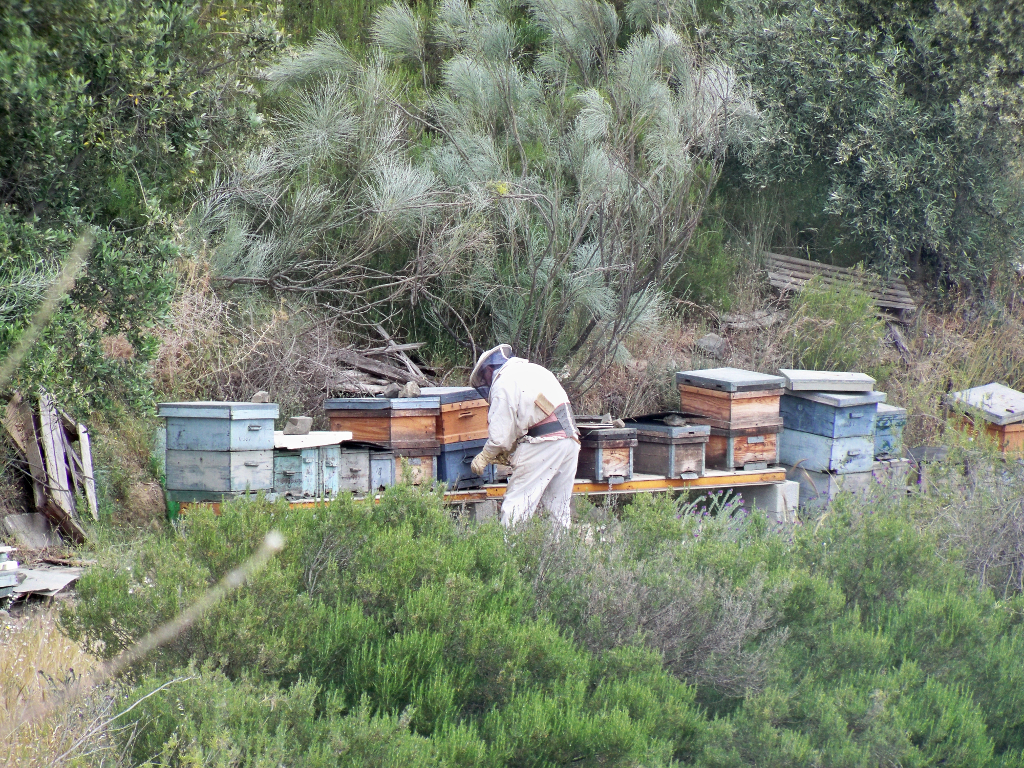
Beekeepers' hives of bees can help pollinate the surrounding crops, which is a positive production externality.

- A beekeeper who keeps the bees for their honey. A side effect or externality associated with such activity is the pollination of surrounding crops by the bees. The value generated by the pollination may be more important than the value of the harvested honey.
- The corporate development of some free software (studied notably by Jean Tirole and Steven Weber)
- Research and development, since much of the economic benefits of research are not captured by the originating firm.
- An industrial company providing first aid classes for employees to increase on the job safety. This may also save lives outside the factory.
- Restored historic buildings may encourage more people to visit the area and patronize nearby businesses.
- A foreign firm that demonstrates up-to-date technologies to local firms and improves their productivity.
- Public transport can increase economic welfare by providing transit services to other economic activities, however the benefits of those other economic activities are not felt by the operator, it can also decrease the negative externalities of increasing road patronage in the absence of a congestion charge.
- The personal cost of an education will have an external benefit to society.

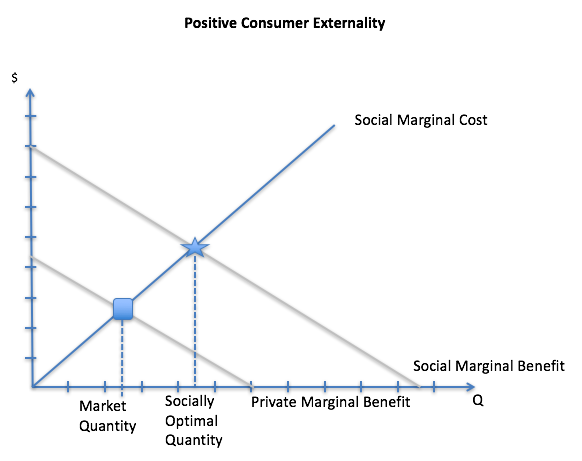
Positive consumption externality

==== Positive consumption externalities ====
Examples of positive consumption externalities include:

- An individual who maintains an attractive house may confer benefits to neighbors in the form of increased market values for their properties. This is an example of a pecuniary externality, because the positive spillover is accounted for in market prices. In this case, house prices in the neighborhood will increase to match the increased real estate value from maintaining their aesthetic. (such as by mowing the lawn, keeping the trash orderly, and getting the house painted)
- Anything that reduces the rate of transmission of an infectious disease carries positive externalities. This includes vaccines, quarantine, tests and other diagnostic procedures. For airborne infections, it also includes masking. For waterborne diseases, it includes improved sewers and sanitation. (See herd immunity)
- Increased education of individuals, as this can lead to broader society benefits in the form of greater economic productivity, a lower unemployment rate, greater household mobility and higher rates of political participation.
- An individual buying a product that is interconnected in a network (e.g., a smartphone). This will increase the usefulness of such phones to other people who have a video cellphone. When each new user of a product increases the value of the same product owned by others, the phenomenon is called a network externality or a network effect. Network externalities often have "tipping points" where, suddenly, the product reaches general acceptance and near-universal usage.
- In an area that does not have a public fire department, homeowners who purchase private fire protection services provide a positive externality to neighboring properties, which are less at risk of the protected neighbor's fire spreading to their (unprotected) house.

Collective solutions or public policies are implemented to regulate activities with positive or negative externalities.

=== Positional ===
The sociological basis of positional externalities is rooted in the theories of conspicuous consumption and positional goods.

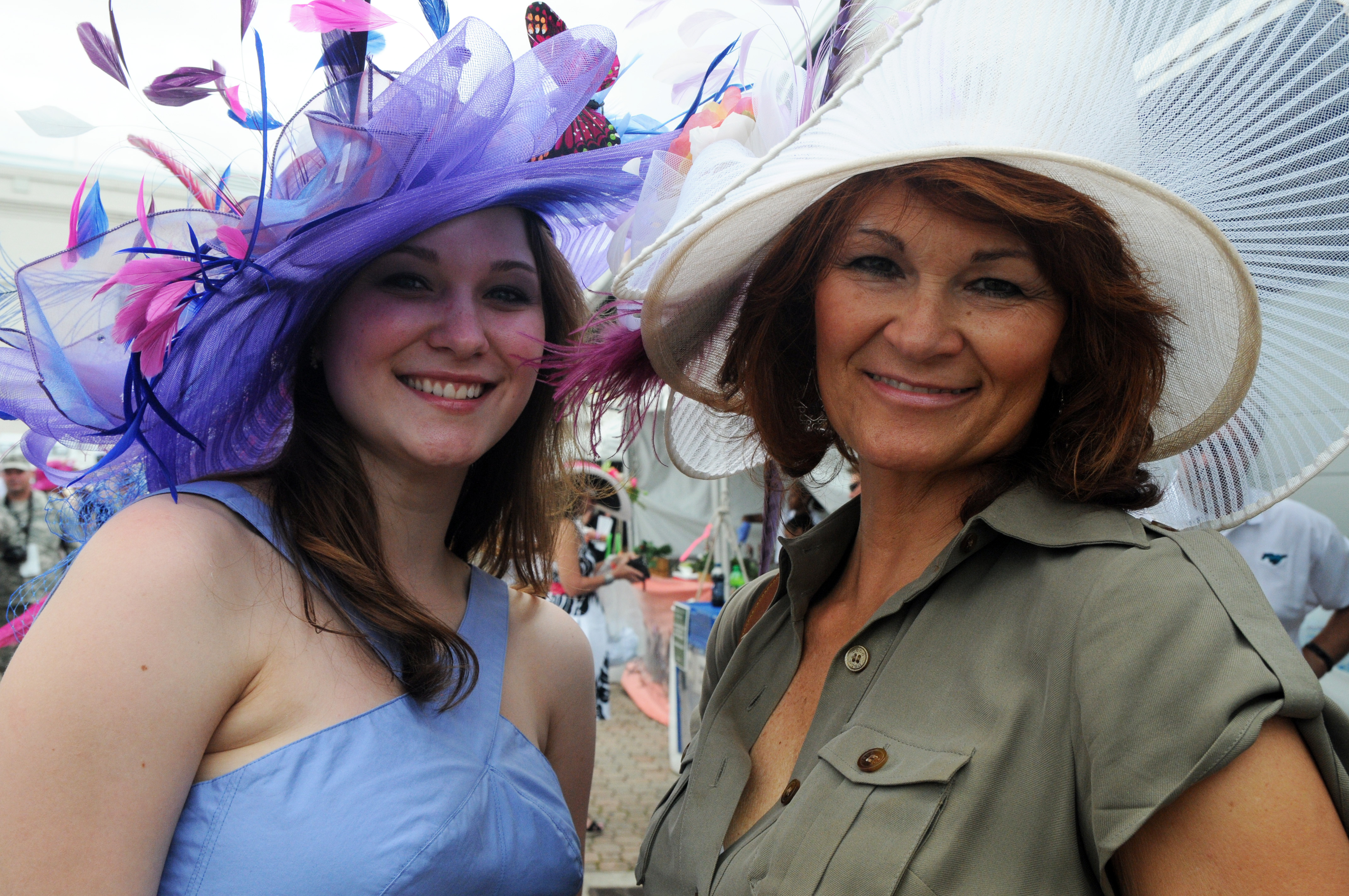
At the Kentucky Derby, a major horse racing competition, some audience members wear expensive hats to display their wealth and status.

Conspicuous consumption (originally articulated by Veblen, 1899) refers to the consumption of goods or services primarily for the purpose of displaying social status or wealth. In simpler terms, individuals engage in conspicuous consumption to signal their economic standing or to gain social recognition. Positional goods (introduced by Hirsch, 1977) are such goods, whose value is heavily contingent upon how they compare to similar goods owned by others. Their desirability is or derived utility is intrinsically tied to their relative scarcity or exclusivity within a particular social context.

The economic concept of Positional externalities originates from Duesenberry's Relative Income Hypothesis. This hypothesis challenges the conventional microeconomic model, as outlined by the Common Pool Resource (CPR) mechanism, which typically assumes that an individual's utility derived from consuming a particular good or service remains unaffected by other's consumption choices. Instead, Duesenberry posits that individuals gauge the utility of their consumption based on a comparison with other consumption bundles, thus introducing the notion of relative income into economic analysis. Consequently, the consumption of positional goods becomes highly sought after, as it directly impacts one's perceived status relative to others in their social circle.

Example: consider a scenario where individuals within a social group vie for the latest luxury cars. As one member acquires a top-of-the-line vehicle, others may feel compelled to upgrade their own cars to preserve their status within the group. This cycle of competitive consumption can result in inefficient allocation of resources and exacerbate income inequality within society.

The consumption of positional goods engenders negative externalities, wherein the acquisition of such goods by one individual diminishes the utility or value of similar goods held by others within the same reference group. This positional externality, can lead to a cascade of overconsumption, as individuals strive to maintain or improve their relative position through excessive spending.

Positional externalities are related, but not similar to Pecuniary externalities.

=== Pecuniary ===
Pecuniary externalities are those which affect a third party's profit but not their ability to produce or consume. These externalities "occur when new purchases alter the relevant context within which an existing positional good is evaluated." Robert H. Frank gives the following example:

if some job candidates begin wearing expensive custom-tailored suits, a side effect of their action is that other candidates become less likely to make favorable impressions on interviewers. From any individual job seeker's point of view, the best response might be to match the higher expenditures of others, lest her chances of landing the job fall. But this outcome may be inefficient since when all spend more, each candidate's probability of success remains unchanged. All may agree that some form of collective restraint on expenditure would be useful."

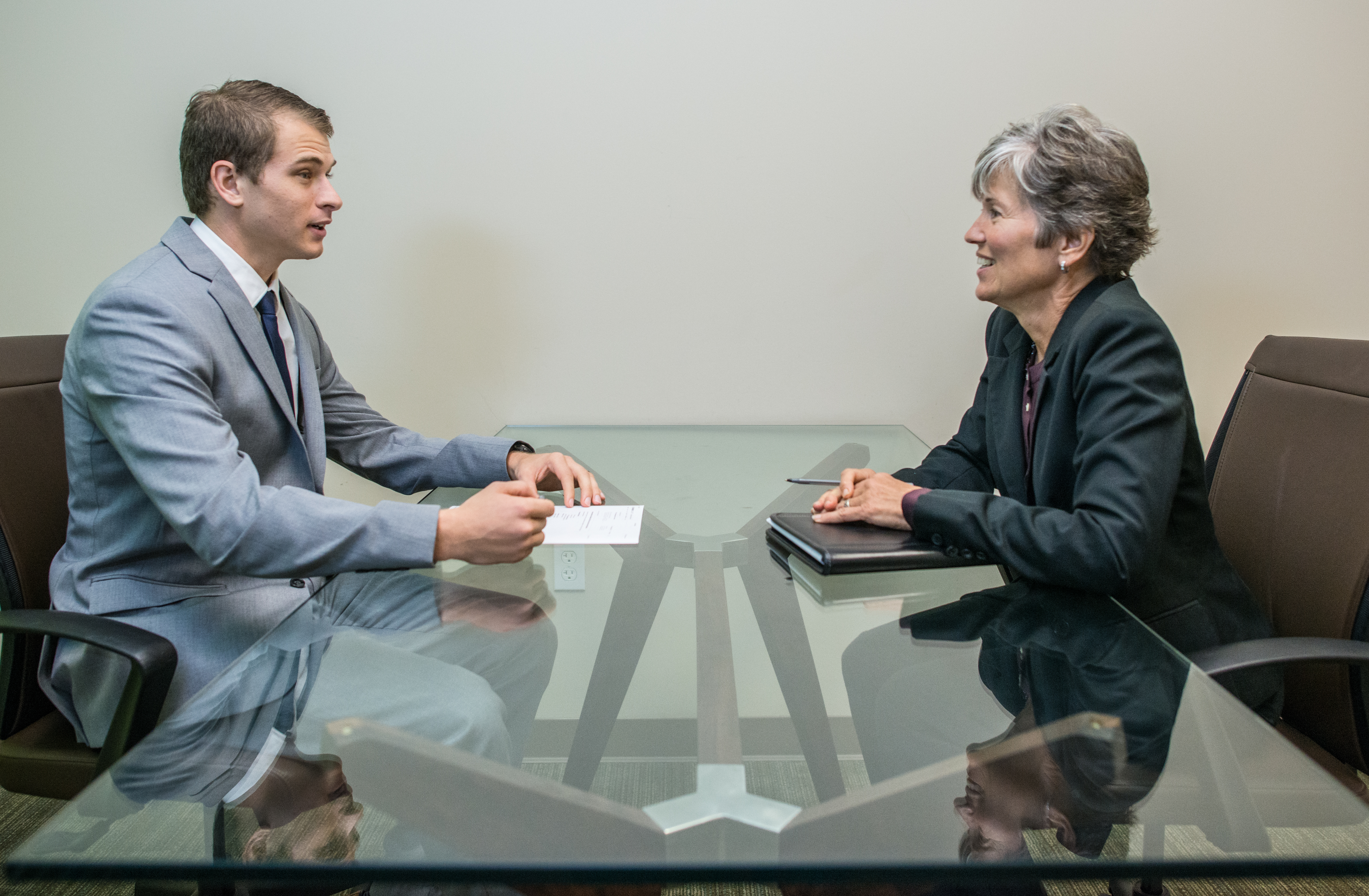
A man in a suit is being interviewed by a woman.

Frank notes that treating positional externalities like other externalities might lead to "intrusive economic and social regulation." He argues, however, that less intrusive and more efficient means of "limiting the costs of expenditure cascades"—i.e., the hypothesized increase in spending of middle-income families beyond their means "because of indirect effects associated with increased spending by top earners"—exist; one such method is the personal income tax.

=== Inframarginal ===
The concept of inframarginal externalities was introduced by James Buchanan and Craig Stubblebine in 1962. Inframarginal externalities differ from other externalities in that there is no benefit or loss to the marginal consumer. At the relevant margin to the market, the externality does not affect the consumer and does not cause a market inefficiency. The externality only affects at the inframarginal range outside where the market clears. These types of externalities do not cause inefficient allocation of resources and do not require policy action.

=== Technological ===
Technological externalities directly affect a firm's production and therefore, indirectly influence an individual's consumption; and the overall impact of society; for example Open-source software or free software development by corporations.

== Supply and demand diagram ==
The usual economic analysis of externalities can be illustrated using a standard supply and demand diagram if the externality can be valued in terms of money. An extra supply or demand curve is added, as in the diagrams below. One of the curves is the private cost that consumers pay as individuals for additional quantities of the good, which in competitive markets, is the marginal private cost. The other curve is the true cost that society as a whole pays for production and consumption of increased production the good, or the marginal social cost. Similarly, there might be two curves for the demand or benefit of the good. The social demand curve would reflect the benefit to society as a whole, while the normal demand curve reflects the benefit to consumers as individuals and is reflected as effective demand in the market.

What curve is added depends on the type of externality that is described, but not whether it is positive or negative. Whenever an externality arises on the production side, there will be two supply curves (private and social cost). However, if the externality arises on the consumption side, there will be two demand curves instead (private and social benefit). This distinction is essential when it comes to resolving inefficiencies that are caused by externalities.

=== External costs ===
Demand curve with external costs; if social costs are not accounted for price is too low to cover all costs and hence quantity produced is unnecessarily high (because the producers of the good and their customers are essentially underpaying the total, real factors of production).

The graph shows the effects of a negative externality. For example, the steel industry is assumed to be selling in a competitive market – before pollution-control laws were imposed and enforced (e.g. under laissez-faire). The marginal private cost is less than the marginal social or public cost by the amount of the external cost, i.e., the cost of air pollution and water pollution. This is represented by the vertical distance between the two supply curves. It is assumed that there are no external benefits, so that social benefit equals individual benefit.

If the consumers only take into account their own private cost, they will end up at price P_{p} and quantity Q_{p}, instead of the more efficient price P_{s} and quantity Q_{s}. These latter reflect the idea that the marginal social benefit should equal the marginal social cost, that is that production should be increased only as long as the marginal social benefit exceeds the marginal social cost. The result is that a free market is inefficient since at the quantity Q_{p}, the social benefit is less than the social cost, so society as a whole would be better off if the goods between Q_{p} and Q_{s} had not been produced. The problem is that people are buying and consuming too much steel.

This discussion implies that negative externalities (such as pollution) are more than merely an ethical problem. The problem is one of the disjunctures between marginal private and social costs that are not solved by the free market. It is a problem of societal communication and coordination to balance costs and benefits. This also implies that pollution is not something solved by competitive markets. Some collective solution is needed, such as a court system to allow parties affected by the pollution to be compensated, government intervention banning or discouraging pollution, or economic incentives such as green taxes.

=== External benefits ===
Supply curve with external benefits; when the market does not account for the additional social benefits of a good both the price for the good and the quantity produced are lower than the market could bear.

The graph shows the effects of a positive or beneficial externality. For example, the industry supplying smallpox vaccinations is assumed to be selling in a competitive market. The marginal private benefit of getting the vaccination is less than the marginal social or public benefit by the amount of the external benefit (for example, society as a whole is increasingly protected from smallpox by each vaccination, including those who refuse to participate). This marginal external benefit of getting a smallpox shot is represented by the vertical distance between the two demand curves. Assume there are no external costs, so that social cost equals individual cost.

If consumers only take into account their own private benefits from getting vaccinations, the market will end up at price P_{p} and quantity Q_{p} as before, instead of the more efficient price P_{s} and quantity Q_{s}. This latter again reflect the idea that the marginal social benefit should equal the marginal social cost, i.e., that production should be increased as long as the marginal social benefit exceeds the marginal social cost. The result in an unfettered market is inefficient since at the quantity Q_{p}, the social benefit is greater than the societal cost, so society as a whole would be better off if more goods had been produced. The problem is that people are buying too few vaccinations.

The issue of external benefits is related to that of public goods, which are goods where it is difficult if not impossible to exclude people from benefits. The production of a public good has beneficial externalities for all, or almost all, of the public. As with external costs, there is a problem here of societal communication and coordination to balance benefits and costs. This also implies that vaccination is not something solved by competitive markets. The government may have to step in with a collective solution, such as subsidizing or legally requiring vaccine use. If the government does this, the good is called a merit good. Examples include policies to accelerate the introduction of electric vehicles or promote cycling, both of which benefit public health.

== Causes ==
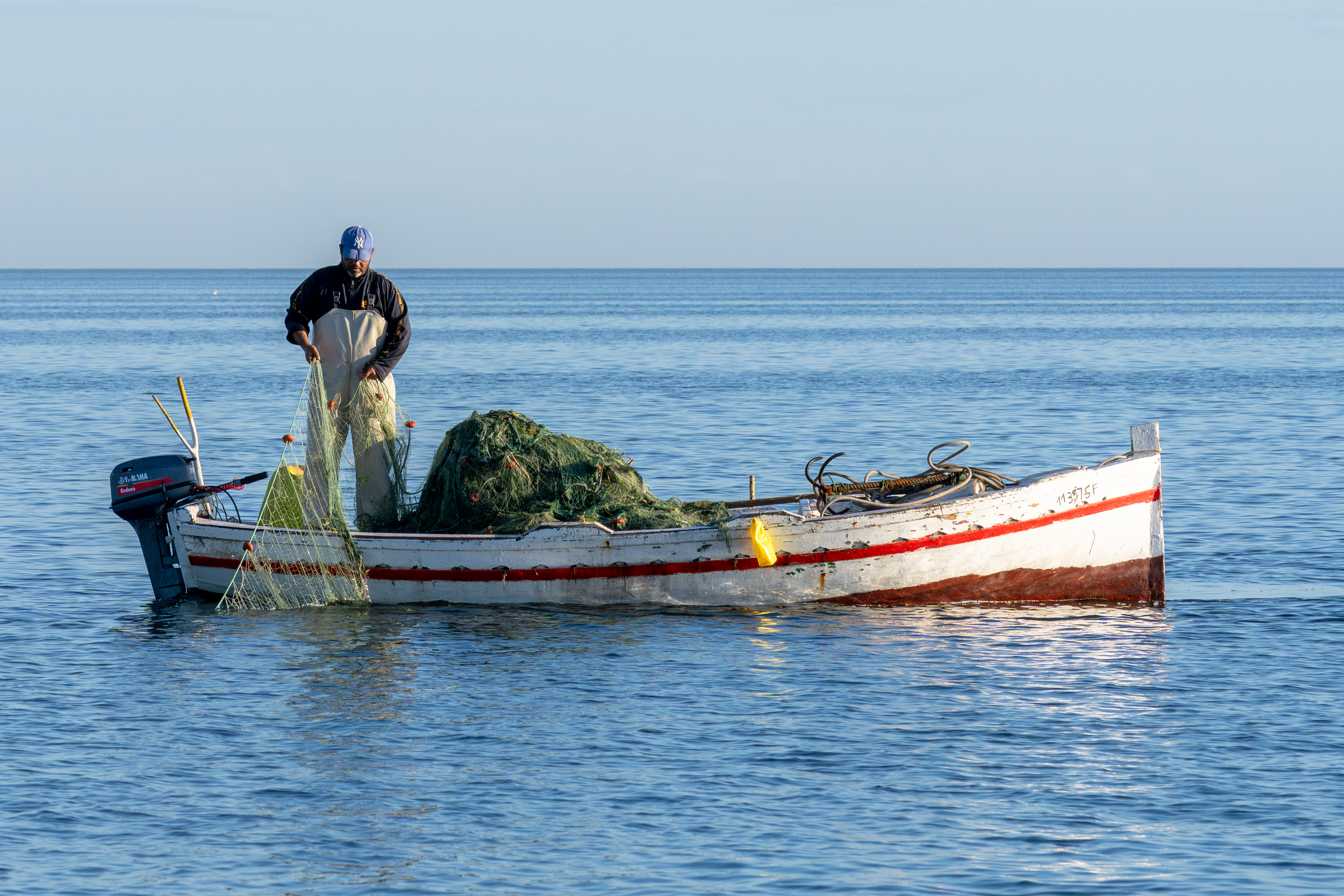
If there are no rules on how many fish fishers can catch, fishing can lead to resource depletion.

Externalities often arise from incompletely defined property rights.

While property rights to some things, such as objects, land, and money can be easily defined and protected, air, water, and wild animals often flow freely across personal and political borders, making it much more difficult to assign ownership. This incentivizes agents to consume them without paying the full cost, leading to negative externalities. Positive externalities similarly accrue from poorly defined property rights. For example, a person who gets a flu vaccination cannot own part of the herd immunity this confers on society, so they may choose not to be vaccinated.

Another common cause of externalities is the presence of transaction costs. Transaction costs are the cost of making an economic trade. These costs prevent economic agents from making exchanges they should be making. The costs of the transaction outweigh the benefit to the agent. When not all mutually beneficial exchanges occur in a market, that market is inefficient. Without transaction costs, agents could freely negotiate and internalize all externalities.

== Possible solutions ==
=== Solutions in non-market economies ===
- In planned economies, production is typically limited only to necessity, which would eliminate externalities created by overproduction.
- The central planner can decide to create and allocate jobs in industries that work to mitigate externalities, rather than waiting for the market to create a demand for these jobs.

=== Solutions in market economies ===
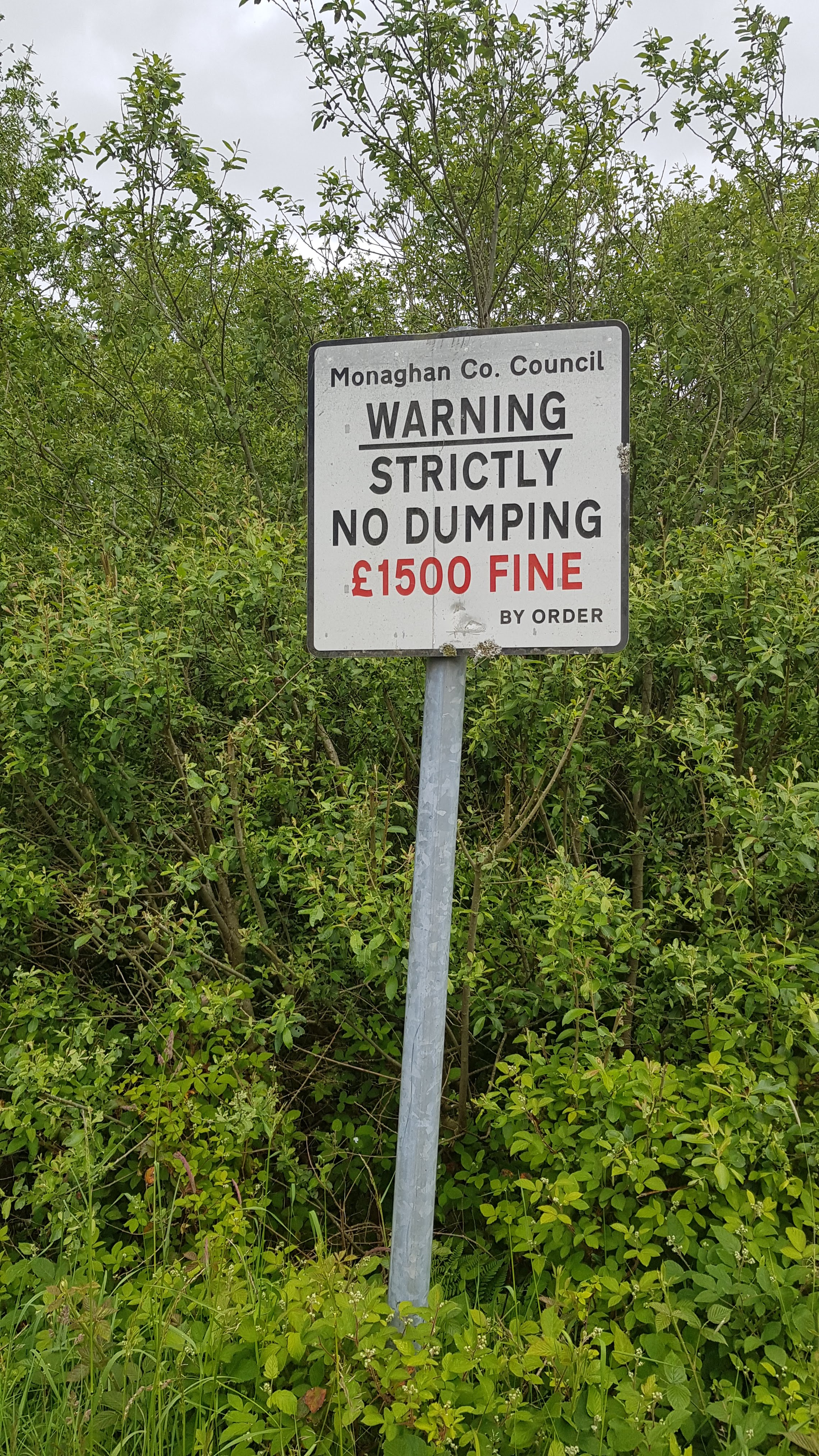
Regulations against actions with negative externalities, like "No Dumping" laws, can reduce these actions.

There are several general types of solutions to the problem of externalities, including both public- and private-sector resolutions:

- Corporations or partnerships will allow confidential sharing of information among members, reducing the positive externalities that would occur if the information were shared in an economy consisting only of individuals.
- Pigovian taxes or subsidies intended to redress economic injustices or imbalances.
- Regulation to limit activity that might cause negative externalities
- Government provision of services with positive externalities
- Lawsuits to compensate affected parties for negative externalities
- Voting to cause participants to internalize externalities subject to the conditions of the efficient voter rule.
- Mediation or negotiation between those affected by externalities and those causing them

A Pigovian tax (also called Pigouvian tax, after economist Arthur C. Pigou) is a tax imposed that is equal in value to the negative externality. In order to fully correct the negative externality, the per unit tax should equal the marginal external cost. The result is that the market outcome would be reduced to the efficient amount. A side effect is that revenue is raised for the government, reducing the amount of distortionary taxes that the government must impose elsewhere. Governments justify the use of Pigovian taxes saying that these taxes help the market reach an efficient outcome because this tax bridges the gap between marginal social costs and marginal private costs.

Some arguments against Pigovian taxes say that the tax does not account for all the transfers and regulations involved with an externality. In other words, the tax only considers the amount of externality produced. Another argument against the tax is that it does not take private property into consideration. Under the Pigovian system, one firm, for example, can be taxed more than another firm, even though the other firm is actually producing greater amounts of the negative externality.

Further arguments against Pigou disagree with his assumption every externality has someone at fault or responsible for the damages. Coase argues that externalities are reciprocal in nature. Both parties must be present for an externality to exist. He uses the example of two neighbors. One neighbor possesses a fireplace, and often lights fires in his house without issue. Then one day, the other neighbor builds a wall that prevents the smoke from escaping and sends it back into the fire-building neighbor's home. This illustrates the reciprocal nature of externalities. Without the wall, the smoke would not be a problem, but without the fire, the smoke would not exist to cause problems in the first place. Coase also takes issue with Pigou's assumption of a "benevolent despot" government. Pigou assumes the government's role is to see the external costs or benefits of a transaction and assign an appropriate tax or subsidy. Coase argues that the government faces costs and benefits just like any other economic agent, so other factors play into its decision-making.

However, the most common type of solution is a tacit agreement through the political process. Governments are elected to represent citizens and to strike political compromises between various interests. Normally governments pass laws and regulations to address pollution and other types of environmental harm. These laws and regulations can take the form of "command and control" regulation (such as enforcing standards and limiting process variables), or environmental pricing reform (such as ecotaxes or other Pigovian taxes, tradable pollution permits or the creation of markets for ecological services). The second type of resolution is a purely private agreement between the parties involved.

Government intervention might not always be needed. Traditional ways of life may have evolved as ways to deal with external costs and benefits. Alternatively, democratically run communities can agree to deal with these costs and benefits in an amicable way. Externalities can sometimes be resolved by agreement between the parties involved. This resolution may even come about because of the threat of government action.

The use of taxes and subsidies in solving the problem of externalities Correction tax, respectively subsidy, means essentially any mechanism that increases, respectively decreases, the costs (and thus price) associated with the activities of an individual or company.

The private-sector may sometimes be able to drive society to the socially optimal resolution. Ronald Coase argued that an efficient outcome can sometimes be reached without government intervention. Some take this argument further, and make the political argument that government should restrict its role to facilitating bargaining among the affected groups or individuals and to enforcing any contracts that result.

This result, often known as the Coase theorem, requires that

- Property rights be well-defined
- People act rationally
- Transaction costs be minimal (costless bargaining)
- Complete information

If all of these conditions apply, the private parties can bargain to solve the problem of externalities. The second part of the Coase theorem asserts that, when these conditions hold, whoever holds the property rights, a Pareto efficient outcome will be reached through bargaining.

This theorem would not apply to the steel industry case discussed above. For example, with a steel factory that trespasses on the lungs of a large number of individuals with pollution, it is difficult if not impossible for any one person to negotiate with the producer, and there are large transaction costs. Hence the most common approach may be to regulate the firm (by imposing limits on the amount of pollution considered "acceptable") while paying for the regulation and enforcement with taxes. The case of the vaccinations would also not satisfy the requirements of the Coase theorem. Since the potential external beneficiaries of vaccination are the people themselves, the people would have to self-organize to pay each other to be vaccinated. But such an organization that involves the entire populace would be indistinguishable from government action.

In some cases, the Coase theorem is relevant. For example, if a logger is planning to clear-cut a forest in a way that has a negative impact on a nearby resort, the resort-owner and the logger could, in theory, get together to agree to a deal. For example, the resort-owner could pay the logger not to clear-cut – or could buy the forest. The most problematic situation, from Coase's perspective, occurs when the forest literally does not belong to anyone, or in any example in which there are not well-defined and enforceable property rights; the question of "who" owns the forest is not important, as any specific owner will have an interest in coming to an agreement with the resort owner (if such an agreement is mutually beneficial).

However, the Coase theorem is difficult to implement because Coase does not offer a negotiation method. Moreover, Coasian solutions are unlikely to be reached due to the possibility of running into the assignment problem, the holdout problem, the free-rider problem, or transaction costs. Additionally, firms could potentially bribe each other since there is little to no government interaction under the Coase theorem. For example, if one oil firm has a high pollution rate and its neighboring firm is bothered by the pollution, then the latter firm may move depending on incentives. Thus, if the oil firm were to bribe the second firm, the first oil firm would suffer no negative consequences because the government would not know about the bribing.

In a dynamic setup, Rosenkranz and Schmitz (2007) have shown that the impossibility to rule out Coasean bargaining tomorrow may actually justify Pigouvian intervention today. To see this, note that unrestrained bargaining in the future may lead to an underinvestment problem (the so-called hold-up problem). Specifically, when investments are relationship-specific and non-contractible, then insufficient investments will be made when it is anticipated that parts of the investments' returns will go to the trading partner in future negotiations (see Hart and Moore, 1988). Hence, Pigouvian taxation can be welfare-improving precisely because Coasean bargaining will take place in the future. Antràs and Staiger (2012) make a related point in the context of international trade.

Kenneth Arrow suggests another private solution to the externality problem. He believes setting up a market for the externality is the answer. For example, suppose a firm produces pollution that harms another firm. A competitive market for the right to pollute may allow for an efficient outcome. Firms could bid the price they are willing to pay for the amount they want to pollute, and then have the right to pollute that amount without penalty. This would allow firms to pollute at the amount where the marginal cost of polluting equals the marginal benefit of another unit of pollution, thus leading to efficiency.

Frank Knight also argued against government intervention as the solution to externalities. He proposed that externalities could be internalized with privatization of the relevant markets. He uses the example of road congestion to make his point. Congestion could be solved through the taxation of public roads. Knight shows that government intervention is unnecessary if roads were privately owned instead. If roads were privately owned, their owners could set tolls that would reduce traffic and thus congestion to an efficient level. This argument forms the basis of the traffic equilibrium. This argument supposes that two points are connected by two different highways. One highway is in poor condition, but is wide enough to fit all traffic that desires to use it. The other is a much better road, but has limited capacity. Knight argues that, if a large number of vehicles operate between the two destinations and have freedom to choose between the routes, they will distribute themselves in proportions such that the cost per unit of transportation will be the same for every truck on both highways. This is true because as more trucks use the narrow road, congestion develops and as congestion increases it becomes equally profitable to use the poorer highway. This solves the externality issue without requiring any government tax or regulations.

=== Solutions to greenhouse gas emission externalities ===
The negative effect of carbon emissions and other greenhouse gases produced in production exacerbate the numerous environmental and human impacts of anthropogenic climate change. These negative effects are not reflected in the cost of producing, nor in the market price of the final goods. There are many public and private solutions proposed to combat this externality

==== Emissions fee ====
An emissions fee, or carbon tax, is a tax levied on each unit of pollution produced in the production of a good or service. The tax incentivised producers to either lower their production levels or to undertake abatement activities that reduce emissions by switching to cleaner technology or inputs.

==== Cap-and-trade systems ====
The cap-and-trade system enables the efficient level of pollution (determined by the government) to be achieved by setting a total quantity of emissions and issuing tradable permits to polluting firms, allowing them to pollute a certain share of the permissible level. Permits will be traded from firms that have low abatement costs to firms with higher abatement costs and therefore the system is both cost-effective and cost-efficient. The cap and trade system has some practical advantages over an emissions fee such as the fact that: 1. it reduces uncertainty about the ultimate pollution level. 2. If firms are profit maximizing, they will utilize cost-minimizing technology to attain the standard which is efficient for individual firms and provides incentives to the research and development market to innovate. 3. The market price of pollution rights would keep pace with the price level while the economy experiences inflation.

The emissions fee and cap and trade systems are both incentive-based approaches to solving a negative externality problem.

==== Command-and-control regulations ====
Command-and-control regulations act as an alternative to the incentive-based approach. They require a set quantity of pollution reduction and can take the form of either a technology standard or a performance standard. A technology standard requires pollution producing firms to use specified technology. While it may reduce the pollution, it is not cost-effective and stifles innovation by incentivising research and development for technology that would work better than the mandated one. Performance standards set emissions goals for each polluting firm. The free choice of the firm to determine how to reach the desired emissions level makes this option slightly more efficient than the technology standard, however, it is not as cost-effective as the cap-and-trade system since the burden of emissions reduction cannot be shifted to firms with lower abatement.

==== Scientific calculation of external costs ====
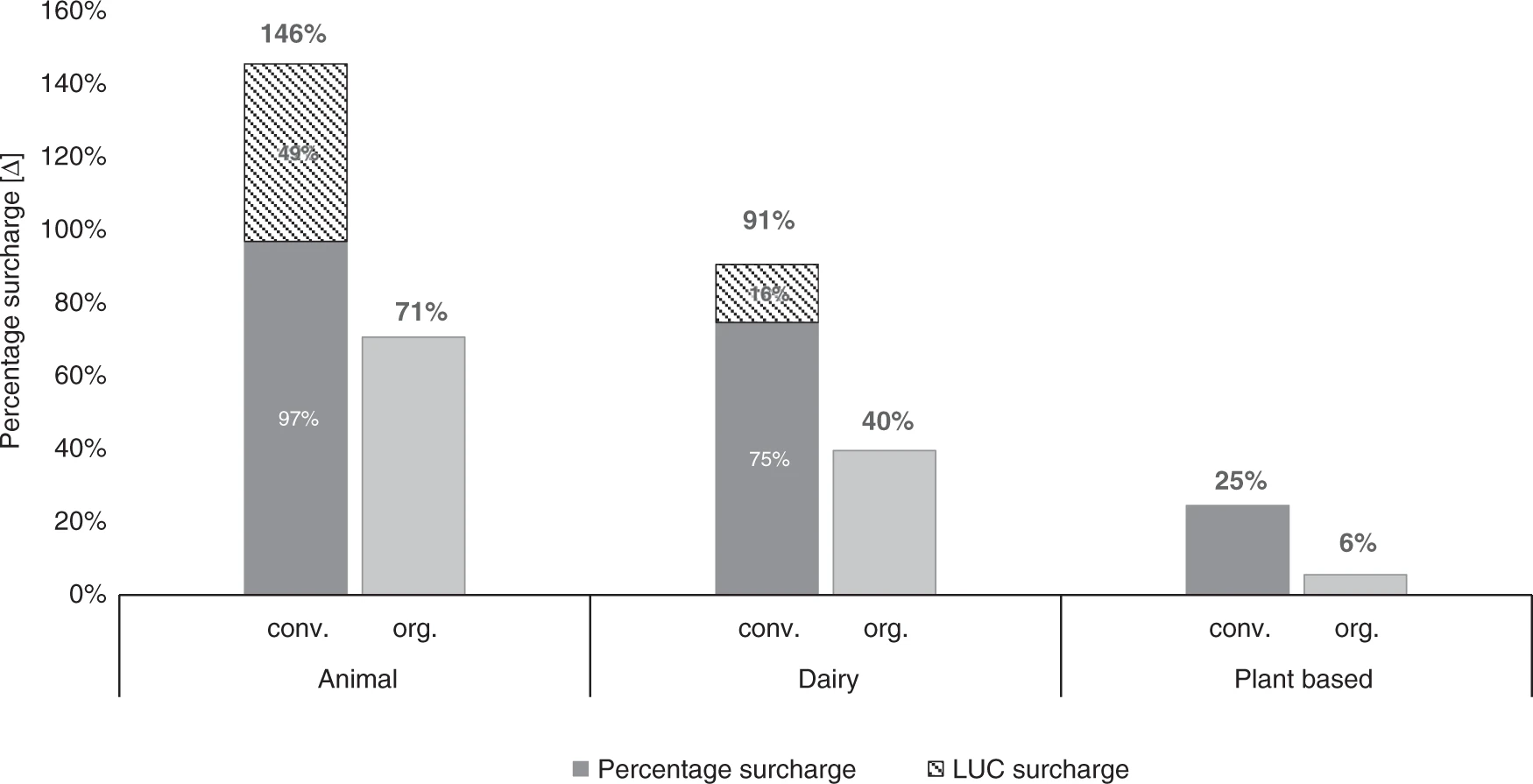
"Relative percentage price [∆] increases for broad categories [...] when externalities of greenhouse gas emissions are included in the producer's price."

A 2020 scientific analysis of external climate costs of foods indicates that external greenhouse gas costs are typically highest for animal-based products – conventional and organic to about the same extent within that ecosystem-subdomain – followed by conventional dairy products and lowest for organic plant-based foods and concludes that contemporary monetary evaluations are "inadequate" and that policy-making that lead to reductions of these costs to be possible, appropriate and urgent.

== Criticism ==
Ecological economics criticizes the concept of externality because there is not enough system thinking and integration of different sciences in the concept. Ecological economics is founded upon the view that the neoclassical economics (NCE) assumption that environmental and community costs and benefits are mutually cancelling "externalities" is not warranted. Joan Martinez Alier, for instance shows that the bulk of consumers are automatically excluded from having an impact upon the prices of commodities, as these consumers are future generations who have not been born yet. The assumptions behind future discounting, which assume that future goods will be cheaper than present goods, has been criticized by Fred Pearce and by the Stern Report (although the Stern report itself does employ discounting and has been criticized for this and other reasons by ecological economists such as Clive Spash).

Concerning these externalities, some, like the eco-businessman Paul Hawken, argue an orthodox economic line that the only reason why goods produced unsustainably are usually cheaper than goods produced sustainably is due to a hidden subsidy, paid by the non-monetized human environment, community or future generations. These arguments are developed further by Hawken, Amory and Hunter Lovins to promote their vision of an environmental capitalist utopia in Natural Capitalism: Creating the Next Industrial Revolution.

In contrast, ecological economists, like Joan Martinez-Alier, appeal to a different line of reasoning. Rather than assuming some (new) form of capitalism is the best way forward, an older ecological economic critique questions the very idea of internalizing externalities as providing some corrective to the current system. The work by Karl William Kapp argues that the concept of "externality" is a misnomer. In fact the modern business enterprise operates on the basis of shifting costs onto others as normal practice to make profits. Charles Eisenstein has argued that this method of privatising profits while socialising the costs through externalities, passing the costs to the community, to the natural environment or to future generations is inherently destructive. Social ecological economist Clive Spash argues that externality theory fallaciously assumes environmental and social problems are minor aberrations in an otherwise perfectly functioning efficient economic system. Internalizing the odd externality does nothing to address the structural systemic problem and fails to recognize the all pervasive nature of these supposed "externalities". This is precisely why heterodox economists argue for a heterodox theory of social costs to effectively prevent the problem through the precautionary principle.

== See also ==
- CC–PP game – Concept in resource allocation to explain economic decision-making
- Club good – Type of economic goods
- Coase theorem – Theorem in economics
- Externalities of automobiles – Impacts of car use
- Incentive compatibility – Concept in game theory
- Internality
- There ain't no such thing as a free lunch – Adage of the impossibility of getting something for nothing
- Tragedy of the commons – Overuse of a shared resource
- True cost accounting – Accounting that measures the hidden impacts of economic activities on the environment
- Unintended consequences – Unforeseen outcomes of an action
