= Institutional complementarity =

Situations of interdependence among institutions

Institutional complementarity refers to situations of interdependence among institutions. This concept is frequently used to explain the degree of institutional diversity that can be observed across and within socio-economic systems, and its consequences on economic performance. In particular, the concept of institutional complementarity has been used to illustrate why institutions are resistant to change and why introducing new institutions into a system often leads to unintended, sometimes suboptimal, consequences.

Approaches, based on the concept of institutional complementarities, have found applications across a wide range of institutional spheres, going from firm governance and industrial relations to varieties of capitalism and political reforms. Formal models have also been developed to study the nature and consequences of institutional complementarity. After a brief description of the canonical formal representation of institutional complementarity, the most relevant domains of applications will be discussed.

== Models of institutional complementarity ==
The concept of institutional complementarity has deep roots in the social sciences. Whereas the sociological approach of the interdependence of different institutions has left the actions of the individuals largely outside the analysis, the modern approach, developed mainly by economists, has been based on the analysis of the constraints facing the actions of the individuals acting in different domains of choice. This approach has found applications across a wide range of institutional spheres, going from firm governance and industrial relations to varieties of capitalism and political reforms. Formal models have also been developed to study the nature and consequences of institutional complementarity.

The canonical model of institutional complementarity is due to Masahiko Aoki and relies on the theory of supermodular games developed by Paul Milgrom and John Roberts. The basic structure of the model takes the following form.

Consider a setting with two institutional domains, A and B, and two sets of agents, C and D that do not directly interact with each other. Nevertheless, an institution implemented in one domain parametrically affects the consequences of the actions taken in the other domain. For instance, A can be associated with the type of ownership structure prevailing in a given country and B with the structure of labour rights. For simplicity we assume that the technological and natural environment is constant.

Suppose that the agents in domain A can choose a rule from two alternative options: A^{1} and A^{2}; similarly, agents in domain B can choose a rule from either B^{1} or B^{2}. For simplicity, let us assume that all agents in each domain have an identical payoff function u_{i} = u(i ∈ C) or v_{j} = v(j ∈ D) defined on binary choice sets of their own, either {A^{1}; A^{2}} or {B^{1}; B^{2}} , with another sets as the set of parameters. We say that an (endogenous) "rule" is institutionalized in a domain when it is implemented as an equilibrium choice of agents in the relevant domains.

Suppose that the following conditions hold:

$$u(A^1; B^1) - u(A^2; B^1) \geq u(A^1; B^2) - u(A^2; B^2)$$
$$v(B^2; A^2) - v(B^1; A^2) \geq v(B^2; A^1) - v(B^1; A^1)$$

for all i and j. The latter are the so-called supermodular (complementarity) conditions. The first condition implies that the "incremental" benefit for the agents in A from choosing A^{1} rather than A^{2} increases as their institutional environment in B is B^{1} rather than B^{2} . The second condition implies that the incremental benefit for agents in B from choosing B^{2} rather than B^{1} increases if their institutional environment in A is A^{2} rather than A^{1}. Note that these conditions are concerned with the property of incremental payoffs with respect to a change in a parameter value. They do not exclude the possibility that the level of payoff of one rule is strictly higher than that of the other for the agents of one or both domain(s) regardless of the choice of rule in the other domain. In such a case the preferred rule(s) will be implemented autonomously in the relevant domain, while the agents in the other domain will choose the rule that maximizes their payoffs in response to their institutional environment. Then the equilibrium of the system comprising A and B – and thus the institutional arrangement across them – is uniquely determined by preference (technology).

However, there can also be cases in which neither rule dominates the other in either domain in the sense described above. If so, the agents in both domains need to take into account which rule is institutionalized in the other domain. Under the supermodularity condition there can then be two pure Nash equilibria (institutional arrangements) for the system comprising A and B, namely (A^{1}; B^{1}) and (A^{2}; B^{2}). When such multiple equilibria exist, we say that A^{1} and B^{1}, as well as A^{2} and B^{2}, are "institutional complements".

If institutional complementarity exists, each institutional arrangement characterizes as a self-sustaining equilibrium where no agent has an inventive to deviate. It terms of welfare, it may be the case that possible overall institutional arrangements are not mutually Pareto comparable, or that one of them could be even Pareto suboptimal to the other. In these cases history is the main force determining which type of institutional arrangements is likely to emerge, with the consequence that suboptimal outcomes are possible.

Suppose for instance that (A^{2}; B^{2}) is a Pareto-superior institutional arrangement in which u(A^{2}; B^{2}) > u(A^{1}; B^{1}) and v(B^{2}; A^{2}) > v(B^{1}; A^{1}) . However, for some historical reason A^{1} is chosen in domain A and becomes an institutional environment for domain B. Faced with this institutional environment agents in domain B will correspondingly react by choosing reason B^{1}. Thus the Pareto-suboptimal institutional arrangement (A^{1}; B^{1}) will result. This is an instance of coordination failure in the presence of indivisibility.

Obviously, there can also be cases where u(A^{2}; B^{2}) > u(A^{1}; B^{1}) but v(B^{1}; A^{1}) > v(B^{2}; A^{2}). This is an instance where the two viable institutional arrangements cannot be Pareto ranked. Agents exhibit conflicting interests in the two equilibria and the emergence of one institutional arrangement as opposed to the other may depend on the distribution of decisional power. If for some reasons agents choosing in domain A have the power to select and enforce their preferred rule, arrangement (A^{2}; B^{2}) is the most likely outcome. Alternatively, agents choosing in domain B will force the society to adopt (B^{1}; A^{1}).

== Applications ==
Ugo Pagano and Robert Rowthorn present one of the earliest analytical contribution to institutional complementarity. In their models the technological choices take as parameters property rights arrangements whereas the latter are made on the basis of given technologies. The complementarities of technologies and property rights create two different sets of organizational equilibria. For instance, strong rights of the capital owners and a technology with a high intensity of specific and difficult to monitor capital are likely be institutional complements and define one possible organizational equilibrium. However, also strong workers' rights and a technology characterized by a high intensity of highly specific labor can be institutional complements and define an alternative organizational equilibrium. The organizational equilibria approach integrate the approach of Oliver Williamson, which have pointed out the influence of technology on rights and safeguards, and the views of the Radical Economists, who have stressed the opposite direction of causation. The complementarities existing in the different organizational equilibria integrate both directions of causation in a single analytical framework. A similar approach has been used to explain organizational diversity in knowledge-intensive industries, such as software.

Institutional complementarities characterize also the relations between intellectual property and human capital investments. Firms owning much intellectual property enjoy a protection for their investments in human capital, which in turn favor the acquisition of additional intellectual property. By contrast other firms may find themselves in a vicious circle where the lack of intellectual property inhibits the incentive to invest in human capital and low levels of human capital investments involve that little or no intellectual property is ever acquired.

Less formal approaches to institutional complementarities have also been adopted. In their seminal contribution Peter A. Hall and David Soskice develop a broad theoretical framework to study the institutional complementarities that characterize different Varieties of Capitalism. Having a specific focus on the institutions of the political economy the authors develop an actor-centered approach for understanding the institutional similarities and differences among the developed economies. The varieties of capitalism approach has inspired a large number of application to the political economy field. To give some examples, Robert Franzese and Martin Höpner investigate the implications for industrial relations; Margarita Estevez-Abe, Torben Iversen and David Soskice use the approach to analyze social protection; Orfeo Fioretos considers political relationships, international negotiations and national interests; Peter A. Hall and Daniel W. Gingerich study the relationship among labor relations, corporate governance and rates of growth; Bruno Amable analyzes the implications of institutional complementarity for social systems of innovation and production.

In addition to institutional variety, the notion of institutional complementarity has also motivated studies on institutional change. In these works institutional complementarity is often presented as a conservative factor, which increases the stability of the institutional equilibrium. In presence of institutional complementarity change requires the simultaneous variation of different institutional domains, which in turn demands high coordination among the actors involved. Sometime, institutions themselves can act as resources for new courses of action that (incrementally) favor change.

Alongside contributions on the distinct models of capitalism, the concept institutional complementarity has found application also in other domain of analysis. Masahiko Aoki, for instance, studies the role of institutional complementarity in contingent governance models of teams. Mathias Siems and Simon Deakin rely on an institutional complementarity approach to investigate differences in the business laws governing in various countries. Francesca Gagliardi argue in favor of an institutional complementarity relationship between local banking institutions and cooperative firms in Italy. Andrea Bonaccorsi and Grid Thoma, finally, uses the idea of institutional complementarity to investigate inventive performance in nano science and technology.
