= Luxury tax =

Tax on luxury goods

A luxury tax is a tax on luxury goods: products not considered essential. A luxury tax may be modeled after a sales tax or VAT, charged as a percentage on all items of particular classes, except that it mainly directly affects the wealthy because the wealthy are the most likely to buy luxuries such as expensive cars, jewelry, etc. It may also be applied only to purchases over a certain amount; for instance, some U.S. states charge luxury tax on real estate transactions over a certain limit.

A luxury good may be a Veblen good, which is a type of good for which demand increases as price increases. Therefore, the effect of a luxury tax may be to increase demand for certain luxury goods. In general, however, since a luxury good has a high income elasticity of demand by definition, both the income effect and substitution effect will decrease demand sharply as the tax rises.

== Theory ==
Luxury tax is based on the concept of positional goods, which are scarce goods whose value arises as status symbols largely from their ranking against other positional goods. This creates a zero-sum game in which the absolute amount of goods purchased is less relevant than the absolute amount of money spent on them and their relative positions. Agents competing in such a game for pure positional goods do not lose utility if some of this money is taken as tax, because their utility comes as status from the amount of money (displayed to be) spent rather than the use-value of the goods themselves. For a pure positional good, a luxury tax is the perfect form of taxation because it raises revenue without reducing the utility of those paying the tax.

== History ==
In Britain, authorities taxed windows – the window tax – from 1696 to 1851. France imposed window taxes from 1798 to 1926.

In the United States, many states used to collect state sales-tax through the use of "luxury tax tokens", instead of calculating a percentage to be paid in cash like the modern-day practice. Tokens could be purchased from the state and then used at checkouts instead of rendering the sales tax in cash. Some tokens were copper or base metal, while some were even plastic.

== By country ==
=== Bulgaria ===
A luxury tax of 10% on boats over $300,000 and aircraft over $1 million was proposed in 2010 by finance minister Simeon Djankov. Parliament approved the tax for a temporary 3-year period.

=== Norway ===
In Norway, at the beginning of the 20th century, oil-powered cars, sugar products, and chocolates were viewed as luxury goods. Today few Norwegians consider sugar or chocolate a luxury, but the luxury taxes on these goods remain.

=== United States ===
In November 1991, the United States Congress enacted a luxury tax that was signed by President George H. W. Bush. The goal of the tax was to generate additional revenues to reduce the federal budget deficit. This tax was levied on material goods such as watches, expensive furs, boats, yachts, private jet planes, jewelry and expensive cars. Congress enacted a 10 percent luxury surcharge tax on boats over $100,000, cars over $30,000, aircraft over $250,000, and furs and jewelry over $10,000. The federal government estimated that it would raise $9 billion in excess revenues over the following five-year period. However, only two years after its imposition, in August 1993, at the behest of the luxury yacht industry, President Bill Clinton and Congress eliminated the "luxury tax," citing a loss in jobs. The luxury automobile tax remained in effect until 2002.

In sports, the Luxury tax is the incremental tax team owners have to pay for their teams going over the salary cap, acting as a financial penalty for high-spending teams.

A common misconception is that tampons and other menstrual products are taxed as a "luxury item" because they were subject to sales tax in 18 states as of June 2026. In actuality, they are simply subject to the normal state sales tax rate in states where they are not tax-exempt. Such tax-exempt consumer products vary from state to state, but are usually limited to food, prescription drugs, and more rarely, clothing.

== In popular culture ==
One of the squares on the U.S. edition of the board game Monopoly is labeled "Luxury Tax". While there is a picture of a sparkling diamond ring on the square, the only effect is that whoever lands on this square must pay $100 to the bank. On the British edition, the square is labelled "Super Tax", which is an entirely fictional concept.

In the 1961 film Breakfast at Tiffany's, the salesman at Tiffany's tells Holly Golightly and Paul that the "federal tax" referring to the 10 percent luxury tax then in effect was not required on a particular item they were considering as a purchase.

== See also ==
- Luxury Car Tax
- Luxury tax (sports)
- Positional good
- Conspicuous consumption
