= 7 Days (newspaper) =

British left-wing weekly photo newspaper

7 Days was a radical socialist weekly photo newspaper published in the United Kingdom. It was in circulation from 22 October 1971 until 22 March 1972, with a final special edition in May 1972. The paper covered left-wing political events of the period including the 'Mangrove Nine Trial', 'Bloody Sunday' in Northern Ireland, industrial disputes, and the Angry Brigade campaigns. The paper also aligned itself with feminist, anti-racism, and anti-homophobia movements of the early 1970s.

== History ==
7 Days was created by a group from a previous fortnightly newspaper Black Dwarf, after it folded in 1970. Black Dwarf was a 'self-styled non-sectarian paper of the radical left' launched in 1968 with Tariq Ali as the editor, Sheila Rowbotham, and literary agent Clive Goodwin as the fund-raiser and owner of the title. Tariq Ali broke away from Black Dwarf after he acquired funding for newspapers Red Mole and Red Weekly, which were formally affiliated with the Trotskyist International Marxist Group (IMG). Anthony Barnett, who took over editing the Black Dwarf, John Hoyland, John McGrath and Judith Ferguson joined to fund-raise for 7 Days envisioning it would represent 'an independent and intellectually-orientated New Left tradition' and utilise the work of photojournalists to create an innovative layout for the paper. Peter Fuller and Fred Halliday who had contributed to Black Dwarf, as well as Alex Cockburn, John Mathews, Maxine Molyneux, Graham Burchell, Peter Wollen, Gareth Stedman Jones and Rosalind Delmar later joined the planning group. John Berger also contributed and became of trustee of the paper alongside Claude Cockburn and Stuart Hood.

== Aims ==
7 Days aimed to cover the culture of Britain with sections focused on politics, industry, mental health, reproductive rights, and mass media including literature, music and film. The planning group took a year to plan the newspaper with around 25 people involved in monthly discussions about the organisation, content and approach of the paper. The group were clear from the start of the project that there should be a common political approach for the newspaper, that revolutionary slogans should be avoided, and that the focus should be to change the ideology of British society to bring about revolutionary change. The first issue was published on 27 October 1971 leading with a feature on the 'Mangrove Nine Trial' talking to members of the nine defendants, raging against racism in the UK. This set the tone for the rest of the issues of the paper challenging the ideology of mainstream reporting of these events and using 'ideas pieces' to stimulate discussion within the readership.

The paper differentiated itself from other left-wing newspapers by aligning itself with activists in the women's liberation movement. To facilitate this, women from the Women's Liberation Workshop joined the planning group in 'participatory roles' and the paper became a platform for feminist ideas through feminist analysis of politics, art, literature, music, and film. Each issue aimed to confront 'regressive tropes in British values including racism, sexism, philistinism, homophobia and elitism'.

The newspaper was also innovative in its use of photojournalism with Radical photographer Tom Picton joining the collective as a photographer and adviser. The issues included a mixture of photo features and illustrated news from upcoming writers and photographers of the time including John Garrett, Chris Steele Perkins, Richard and Sally Greenhill and Julian Calder. Bill Mayblin worked on the design and layout of the paper with Alex Cockburn and highlighted the Picture Post as a conscious model for 7 Days.

== Decline ==
The decline of 7 Days was led by frustrations and disagreements over the political and editorial direction of the newspaper from within the group. The lack of editorial direction had hindered the creation of a loyal readership to sustain the creation of the paper. There were disagreements from within the group as to why this had occurred with some believing it was due to the failure to address the right audience and use the right tone, whilst others believed that the tone was not the problem and that the paper needed to include more feminism and internationalism instead. The paper was brought to an abrupt end in March 1972 when its funding ran out. The planning group were aware there were only enough funds for 6 months of the paper from the start of the project. The group had expected a faster growth in readership to cover the costs, the 6 months window was not enough time for this to happen. The group decided to stop production, temporarily, with the aim of fundraising more money to restart the project. No funds were raised to revive the project and a special edition dedicated to the Vietnam War was published in May 1972 as the final issue.

== Legacy ==
7 Days is not as well known as its predecessor Black Dwarf or other left-wing radical newspapers such as International Times. However, it encapsulated a significant period of British history over its 6-month existence covering a wide range of British politics and culture within each issue. Maxine Molyneux described working on 7 Days as a 'space where politics, culture and radical ideas found expression' and the period of the early 1970s as one of hope for political progress and social change. It was an 'imaginative venture', which tried to separate itself from militant left-wing journalism tied to political organisations by being independent. Instead, this contributed to its downfall as without a strong network the paper was unable to build up its readership or the financial backing to survive.
