= Expenditure cascades =

Economic term

Expenditure cascades is an economic term coined by researcher Robert H. Frank. It describes changes in purchasing and consumption behaviour which ripple through the levels of income in response to changes in income inequality.

== Example ==
During the late 1900s and early 2000s, income inequality in the United States rose dramatically, and expenditure cascades occurred. During the 1980s, the income-tax structure was altered to favor top earners in regards to after-tax purchasing power.

== Positional externalities ==
Expenditure cascades employ positional externalities, which may be inter-related differently from other types of externalities. When a new purchase changes the context within which an existing positional good is evaluated, a positional externality occurs. In situations where a good is upgraded and becomes a popular item to own, that good becomes a positional externality. It has changed the context within which that good exists. Positional Externalities also have an effect on an individual’s happiness. When a person focuses on the haves and have-nots of those around him, he realizes the items that he does not own relative to the others in his class system. This realization leads to increased unhappiness about his position in life in terms of items owned.

Robert H. Frank cites an experiment that shows people choose a world in which they own a larger home than everyone else, over having larger homes for everyone yet a smaller home than his neighbors. Frank concludes that people will give up absolute consumption in order to obtain a better relative position. Expenditure cascades are triggered by consumption, especially conspicuous consumption, which are known as "consumption cascades". The consumption by the wealthy triggers increased spending in the class directly below them, and the chain continues down to the bottom of the income ladder. This is a dangerous reaction for those at the bottom who have little disposable income originally, and even less after they attempt to keep up with others' spending habits. This is an example of the social phenomenon "keeping up with the Joneses".

== Possible solutions to the problem of positional externalities ==
Frank suggests that a progressive income tax or a progressive consumption tax could remedy the dilemma posed by positional externalities. By increasing the progressivity of the current tax structure, the wealthy would pay a larger share of taxes. Simultaneously, the poor and middle class would pay taxes that would be more equitable to their income. A result would be an equal playing field for all the classes. Frank uses the housing market as an example. He states that people at the top should save their earnings and spend less on housing. In turn, their savings would alter the context that influences housing expenditures of people directly below top earners. This would result in a reverse expenditure cascade that would encourage higher savings.

The fact that Americans had a negative savings rate in 2005, further proves the need for incentives to save money rather than increasing relative spending. The key to creating a genuine impact on spending and saving habits is the collective effort of everyone invested in the economy to cut back on spending. Should a deficit continue, the poor and middle classes will suffer disproportionately to the top earners.
