= Ugo Pagano =

Italian economist and professor at the University of Siena

- Born: 1951 (age 74–75); Naples, Italy

Academic background
- Education: Cambridge University (PhD); University of Siena (B.A.)
- Influences: Karl Marx, Thorstein Veblen, Léon Walras, Charles Darwin

Academic work
- Discipline: Economic theory, Institutional economics, Evolutionary economics
- School or tradition: Marxist, Institutional economics
- Institutions: University of Siena
- Notable ideas: Organizational Equilibrium
- Website: Information at IDEAS / RePEc

Ugo Pagano (born 1951) is an Italian economist. He is the Professor of Economic Policy at the University of Siena (Italy) where he is also Director of the PhD programme in Economics and President of S. Chiara Graduate School.

== Biography ==
Pagano was born in Naples in 1951. He graduated with a M.A. from the University of Siena in 1973. Subsequently, he received his PhD in Economics from Cambridge University where he was later to become University Lecturer and Fellow of Pembroke College.

Pagano was the President of the Italian Association for the Study of Comparative Economic Systems and member of the Council of the European Association for Evolutionary Political Economy. He is former founding editor of the Journal of Institutional Economics.

Currently, Pagano is Professor of Economic Policy and Director of the PhD programme in Economics at the University of Siena where he teaches courses on Theory of the Firm, Law and Economics and Political Economy. He teaches also at Central European University, Budapest.

In 1997 he was awarded the Kapp Prize for the essay 'Transition and the Speciation of the Japanese Model' by the European Association for Evolutionary Political Economy.

== Work and research interest ==
In the first part of his career Pagano has challenged the long tradition that sees economics as a relation between means and ends. Within this context his main contribution has been to endogenise the definition of both means and ends, and to clarify that by considering only leisure as argument of the utility function is tantamount to assuming that workers are physical 'things' not different from iron instead of human beings. On the basis of this critique various welfare theorems could be re-stated: the sum of utilities and productivity of work instead of the utility alone have to be equal in each use; the technological efficiency is not any more an essential requirement for economic efficiency; and the maximisation of profit does not any more imply an efficient allocation of work.

Following this line of research Pagano has enlarged the standard economic view about scarcity. In addition to standard material scarcity he has taken into account some dimensions usually neglected in mainstream economics among which social and intelligence scarcities. With reference to social scarcity Pagano has suggested a way of integrating the analysis of goods such as prestige and power in economic theory. This has been done by introducing a new type of good – positional goods – which have been defined as having the opposite character of public goods. The positive consumption of this type of good is possible only if corresponding negative quantities are consumed by other individuals. Pagano has shown that while public goods are typically undersupplied, positional goods are typically oversupplied. For what concerns instead intelligence scarcity he has suggested that bounded rationality has many dimensions each of which can be represented as a maximisation problem with some additional constraints, only at the cost of contradicting the scarcity assumption at a higher level.

In the literature on the theory of the firm the main contribution of Pagano has been the development of the concept of organizational equilibrium. Combining the literatures of the Neo-institutional and Radical schools he has defined organizational equilibria as situations where a set of rights (technological characteristics of the resources) brings about technological characteristics of the resources (rights) which are consistent with this set of rights (technology). This concept is directly related to the Marxian concept of mode of production and has been lately adopted as a tool to study the evolution of organizational forms in knowledge-intensive productions.

In the field of political economy, following the work of Ernest André Gellner, Pagano has established a link between nationalism and globalisation, highlighting similarities and discontinuities.

Being strongly influenced by the Darwinian theory of evolution, Pagano has also done some works on bioeconomics. In a recent article, in particular, he has suggested that in the course of human evolution sexual selection supplied the development of human brain and intelligence.

Pagano has been deeply involved in the debate concerning the economic crisis started in 2007. He has advanced the hypothesis that some of the roots of the crisis are to be found in the institutions of the knowledge economy, in particular the TRIPs, which have substantially increased the cost of investments. According to this interpretation, the possible remedies to the crisis should not only focus on monetary policy, financial regulations or even on standard Keynesian policies, but should be coupled with policies that decrease the level of intellectual monopolisation of the economy.

On his personal website, Pagano says that as a Director of the PhD Programme in Economics at the University of Siena, he has tried to co-operate with his colleagues to organise graduate programmes where research students feel part of a community within which they make autonomous choices on their research.

== See also ==
- Institutional complementarity

== Publications ==
=== Books and book chapters ===
- Pagano, Ugo (1985). Work and welfare in economic theory. Oxford New York: Basil Blackwell. ISBN 9780631137283.
- Pagno, Ugo (1999), "Is power an economic good? Notes on social scarcity and the economics of positional goods", in Pagano, Ugo; Bowles, Samuel; Franzin, Maurizio (eds.), The politics and economics of power, London New York: Routledge, pp. 53–71, ISBN 9780415185424.
- Pagno, Ugo (2007), "Bounded rationality and institutionalism", in Hodgson, Geoffrey M. (ed.), The evolution of economic institutions a critical reader, Cheltenham, UK Northampton, Massachusetts: Edward Elgar, pp. 34–52, ISBN 9781847200877.

=== Journal articles ===
- Pagano, Ugo (September 1991). "Property rights, asset specificity, and the division of labour under alternative capitalist relations". Cambridge Journal of Economics. 15 (3): 315–342. JSTOR 23598225.
- Pagano, Ugo (February 1992). "Organizational equilibria and production efficiency". Metroeconomica. 43 (1–2): 227–246. doi:10.1111/j.1467-999X.1992.tb00708.x. S2CID 154334622.
- Pagano, Ugo (June 1992). "Authority, co-ordination and disequilibrium: an explanation of the co-existence of markets and firms". Structural Change and Economic Dynamics. 3 (1): 53–77. doi:10.1016/0954-349X(92)90026-3.
- Pagano, Ugo; Rowthorn, Robert (December 1994). "Ownership, technology and institutional stability". Structural Change and Economic Dynamics. 5 (2): 221–242. doi:10.1016/0954-349X(94)90003-5. S2CID 154401089. SSRN 934387.
- Pagano, Ugo (December 2000). "Public markets, private orderings and corporate governance" (PDF). International Review of Law and Economics. 20 (4): 453–477. doi:10.1016/S0144-8188(00)00046-6. SSRN 185130. Pdf.
- Pagano, Ugo (September 2003). "Nationalism, development and integration: the political economy of Ernest Gellner". Cambridge Journal of Economics. 27 (5): 623–646. doi:10.1093/cje/27.5.623. JSTOR 23602113.
- Pagano, Ugo; Rossi, Maria Alessandra (July 2004). "Incomplete contracts, intellectual property and institutional complementarities". European Journal of Law and Economics. 18 (1): 55–76. doi:10.1023/B:EJLE.0000032770.51219.4d. S2CID 13904621. SSRN 326588.
- Pagano, Ugo (December 2007). "Karl Marx after new institutional economics". Evolutionary and Institutional Economics Review. 4 (1): 27–53. doi:10.14441/eier.4.27. S2CID 154641873. Pdf.
- Pagano, Ugo (September 2007). "Cultural globalisation, institutional diversity and the unequal accumulation of intellectual capital". Cambridge Journal of Economics. 31 (5): 649–667. doi:10.1093/cje/bem015. JSTOR 23601645.
- Pagano, Ugo; Battistini, Alberto (April 2008). "Primates' fertilization systems and the evolution of the human brain". Journal of Bioeconomics. 10 (1): 1–21. doi:10.1007/s10818-008-9033-x. S2CID 84827970.
- Pagano, Ugo; Belloc, Marianna (June 2009). "Co-evolution of politics and corporate governance". International Review of Law and Economics. 29 (2): 106–114. doi:10.1016/j.irle.2008.11.002.
- Pagano, Ugo; Rossi, Maria Alessandra (July 2009). "The crash of the knowledge economy". Cambridge Journal of Economics. 33 (4): 665–683. doi:10.1093/cje/bep033. hdl:11365/25698. JSTOR 23601993.
- Pagano, Ugo (November 2014). "The crisis of intellectual monopoly capitalism". Cambridge Journal of Economics. 38 (6): 1409–1429. doi:10.1093/cje/beu025. SSRN 2537972.
