= Convention on Modern Liberty =

British voluntary body

The Convention on Modern Liberty (CML) is a British voluntary body and program of the Open Trust, set up in September 2008, that aims to highlight what it sees as the erosion of civil liberties in the UK. Its stated purpose is: "A call to all concerned with attacks on our fundamental rights and freedoms under pressure from counter-terrorism, financial breakdown and the database state".

On 13 June 2008, MP David Davis resigned from the House of Commons in protest against the decision to extend detention without charge for possible terrorist offences to 42 days, stating that this was an abuse of anti-terror measures. A week later Mark Ross of the Joseph Rowntree Reform Trust contacted Stuart Weir from the Democratic Audit, Anthony Barnett from openDemocracy's OurKingdom and Peter Facey from Unlock Democracy, and suggested they organize a major public meeting and news coverage about the issue Davis raised.

The campaign was founded by Henry Porter, London editor of Vanity Fair, and Anthony Barnett, a founding member of Charter 88. It was sponsored by the Joseph Rowntree Foundation, openDemocracy, Liberty (UK), NO2ID, and The Guardian.

In February 2009, the Convention organised the largest civil liberties gathering ever held in the UK, with meetings of journalists, lawyers, politicians, and campaigners. Speakers included Shami Chakrabarti, Marina Warner, Fatima Bhutto, Timothy Garton Ash, Clive Stafford Smith, Helena Kennedy, and Joanne Cash. More than 1,500 people attended the main event which was held in Bloomsbury, and linked by video to parallel events in Glasgow, Belfast, Bristol, Manchester, Cardiff and Cambridge.
