= Positional good =

Goods whose value is given by desirability rather than quantity

Positional goods are goods valued only by how they are distributed among the population, not by how many of them there are available in total (as would be the case with other consumer goods). They have been theoreticized by Fred Hirsch. The source of greater worth of positional goods is their desirability as a status symbol, which usually results in them greatly exceeding the value of comparable goods.

Various goods have been described as positional in a given capitalist society, such as gold, real estate, diamonds, and luxury goods. Generally any coveted goods, which may be in abundance, that are considered valuable or desirable in order to display or change one's social status when possessed by relatively few in a given community may be described as positional goods. What could be considered a positional good can vary widely depending on cultural or subcultural norms.

More formally in economics, positional goods are a subset of economic goods whose consumption (and subsequent utility), also conditioned by Veblen-like pricing, depends negatively on consumption of those same goods by others. In particular, for these goods the value is at least in part (if not exclusively) a function of its ranking in desirability by others, in comparison to substitutes. The extent to which a good's value depends on such a ranking is referred to as its positionality. The term was coined by Austrian-British financial journalist Fred Hirsch, and the concept has been refined by American economics professor Robert H. Frank and Italian economist Ugo Pagano.

The term is sometimes extended to include services and non-material possessions that may alter one's social status and that are deemed highly desirable when enjoyed by relatively few in a community, such as college degrees, achievements, awards, etc.

== Concept ==
Although Thorstein Veblen emphasized the importance of one's relative position in society with reference to the concept of conspicuous leisure and consumption, it was Fred Hirsch who coined the concept of the "positional good", in Social Limits to Growth. He explained that the positional economy is composed of "all aspects of goods, services, work positions and other social relationships that are either (1) scarce in some absolute or socially imposed sense or (2) subject to congestion and crowding through more extensive use" (Hirsch, 1977: 27).

Hence, Hirsch distinguished categories of positional goods. Some depend, essentially, on their relative positions (pride of superiority, status, and power); others, such as land for leisure activities or land for suburban housing, are positional merely because their total amount is fixed. However, land is valued at least in part for its absolute contribution to productivity, which does not derive from its relative ranking. Thus, some economists (such as Robert H. Frank and Ugo Pagano) include only goods (like status and power) which are valued specifically because of their relative quality. In addition, jural positions can also be considered as positional goods (cf. Pagano and Vatiero 2017, and Vatiero 2021).

Hirsch's main contribution is his assertion that positional goods are inextricably linked to social scarcity – social scarcity relates to the relative standings of different individuals and arises not from physical or natural limitations, but from social factors; for instance, the land in Inter-Provincial Montioni Park is physically scarce, while political leadership positions are socially scarce.

The broad theme of Hirsch's book was, he told The New York Times, that material growth can "no longer deliver what has long been promised for it – to make everyone middle-class". The concept of positional good explains why, as economic growth improves overall quality of life at any particular level, doing "better" than how an individual's grandparents lived does not translate automatically into doing "well", if there are as many or more people ahead of them in the economic hierarchy. For example, if someone is the first in their family to get a college degree, they are doing better. But if they were at the bottom of their class at a weak school, they may find themselves less eligible for a job than their grandfather, who was only a high school graduate. That is, competition for positional goods is a zero-sum game: Attempts to acquire them can only benefit one player at the expense of others.

In the case of positional goods, people benefiting from a positional good do not take into account the externalities of their respective sufferers. That is, in the case of "public ... goods, the consequences of this failure implies that an agent consuming the public good does not get paid for other people's consumption; in the case of a positional ... good, the equivalent failure implies that an agent consuming positive amounts is not charged for the negative consumption of other agent's consumption" (Pagano 1999:71). That is, while, in the case of public goods, we have the standard underinvestment problem in their supply, because excluding individuals from externalities that have the "same sign" may turn out to be impossible, by contrast, in the case of positional goods, we have a problem of over-provision, because all agents may try to consume positive amounts of these goods, neglecting to consider the externality on others. For public goods, an undersupply, for positional goods, it signifies an over-supply. In other words, in positional competitions, people work harder to compete and consume more than they would under optimal conditions.

Some economists, such as Robert Frank, argue that positional goods create externalities and that "positional arms races" can result for goods that might boost one's social status relative to others. This phenomenon, Frank argues, is clearly bad for society, and thus government can improve social welfare by imposing a high luxury tax on certain luxury goods to correct for the externality and mitigate the posited social waste.

However, in some cases it may be less clear that such government intervention is warranted in response to these externalities. For example, in certain cases, such government actions can potentially impede improvements in living standards and innovation. Technological advance itself is possible in part because wealthy individuals are willing to be first purchasers of new and untested goods (e.g., early cellphone models in the early 1990s). There is a certain experimentation and risk that accompany luxury goods, and if they are found to be useful they may eventually be mass-produced and made affordable to the common person: one era's luxuries are another's commonplace goods. In short, the negative positional externality can be compensated by the public goods of infant industry effects and research and development.

In his response to the cited article by Kashdan and Klein, Robert Frank wrote the following:

In the short run, the tax would not change the total level of spending. Rather, it would shift the composition of spending in favor of investment. Innovation is hardly confined to the consumption sector. Producers of capital goods also have strong incentives to come up with useful innovations. And with the greater aggregate investment spending caused by a consumption tax, more resources than before would be available for research and development. There is thus no reason to expect innovation to slow down, even in the short run. In the long run, which is what really counts for the point Kashdan and Klein are attempting to make, their argument collapses completely. Higher rates of investment mean a higher rate of income growth, which means that consumption along the high-savings trajectory will eventually exceed what it would have been had we remained on the low-savings trajectory. From that point forward, there would be more expenditure on innovation in both the consumption and capital goods sectors...

== Definitions ==
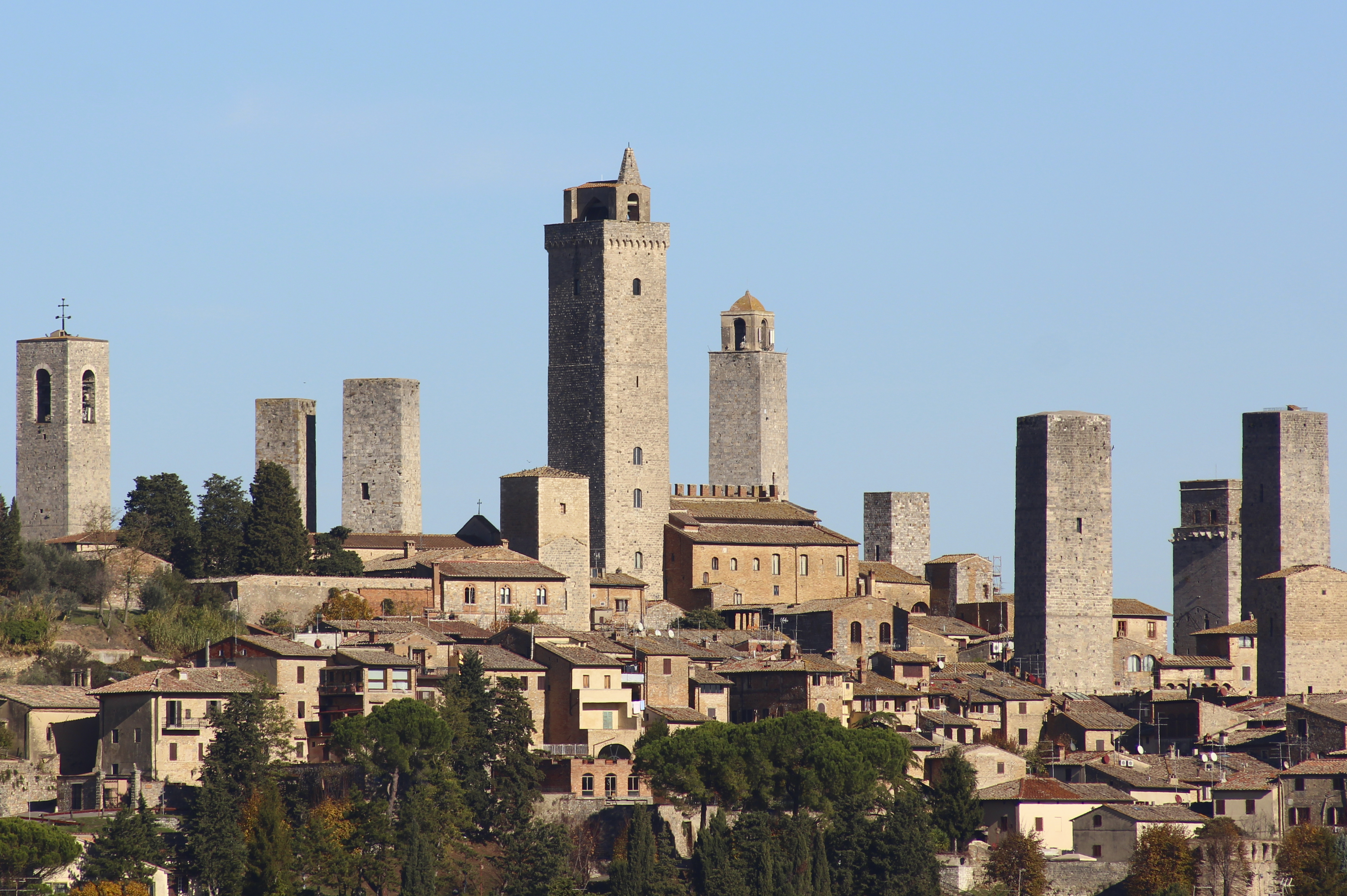
Towers in San Gimignano

One early instance of positional economy comes from San Gimignano – a Tuscan medieval town that has been described as the Manhattan of the Middle Ages because of its towers (in the past there were about eighty towers). Towers were not built by aristocratic families to live in them, but to "demonstrate" to community, their power, affluence, and status of each family. In this case, the owner of a tower consumed a positive level of positional good, like power, instead the family which did not own a tower or owned a lower building consumed a negative level of positional good, that is, it consumed the exposure stemming from the power of the owner. For this reason, there is a zero-sum game in the family consumptions. There is a party consuming a positive amount of positional good and at the same time there is a counterparty consuming a negative amount of such a good. The aristocratic family – owners of a tower – enjoyed the positive consumption of the positional good, namely it had a positive utility deriving from the positional good. On the contrary, the family – non-owners of a tower – suffered from the negative consumption of the positional good (the consumption of exposure to power of others), namely it had a negative utility. For this reason, there is a zero-sum game in the family utilities.

The case of San Gimignano's towers explains three meanings of positional good, each one resting on the idea of social scarcity: 1) the first one based on a zero-sum game in the consumptions, 2) the second one based on a zero-sum game in the payoffs (utilities), and 3) the third one related to higher pricing mechanism to deny the consumption of others.

The definition centered on a zero-sum game in the consumptions is originated from contributions of Ugo Pagano: When one party's level of consumption is positive, then at least one other party's level of consumption must be negative. However while the dimension of positional good is binary, the net (utility) impact of a positional good may be positive, zero, or negative. The individual utility derives from the individual preferences on the level of consumption. If reasonable conditions – positive (negative) consumptions imply positive (negative) utilities – hold, then a second kind of definition of positional goods may be formulated: Zero-sum game in the payoffs. Positional goods are goods whose utility of their consumptions is relative (negatively) to the consumption of the others.

A last definition of positional good derives from the so-called "Veblen effect", which is witnessed whenever individuals are willing to pay higher prices for functionally equivalent goods (a significant example is the luxury goods market). The Veblen effect also implies that a sufficient decrease in price leads not to an increase in demand, but to a decrease, because the social status derived from acquiring the goods in question may fall. In this respect, positional goods are goods for which the satisfaction derives (at least in part) from higher pricing.

This brings us to an intriguing parallel between positional goods, such as "luxury goods", and what are known as "Giffen goods". Rae observed that in the case of "mere luxuries", while a halving of the price would require a doubling in the number of units purchased, in order to satisfy vanity to the same extent, a reduction of the price to a small fraction of its previous level would reduce demand to zero. Cournot also admitted that some goods "of whim and luxury ... are only desirable on account of their rarity and of the high price which is the consequence thereof ... [i]n this case a great fall in price would almost annihilate the demand" (cf. Schneider).

== Triad of economic goods ==
People constantly compare themselves to their environments and care greatly about their relative positions, which influence their choices. Therefore, it could be argued that the paradigm of homo economicus should be extended, so that positional goods are included in theories of individual consumption and social concerns are considered among the basic motivations for individual economic behaviour. The triad of economic goods – private, public, and positional goods – can be defined in terms of individual and total consumption. Private goods are characterized by the fact that they are consumed only by single individuals. The exclusion of others from positive amounts of consumption is impossible in the case of public goods. Instead, when some individuals consume positional goods, other individuals must be included in the consumption of related negative quantities.

A pure positional good can be defined as a good of which a certain amount of positive consumption by one agent is matched by an equally negative amount of consumption by another agent. That is, in the case of positional goods, individuals' consumption levels have opposite signs. However, in the case of certain positional goods, such as Olympic medals, one may talk of new positional products created out of nothing; such products do not result in negative externalities, especially if even last place at the Olympics is viewed as prestigious enough to bring positive utility to the competitor.

The distinction among private, public and positional goods brings different rules for deriving total demand. In a diagrammatic view, total demand of a private good is the horizontal sum of individual demands. For a public good, instead, total demand is the Samuelsonian vertical summation of individual demands. Finally, for positional goods, the optimal level of consumption does not coincide, as it does in the case of private goods, with the intersection of any individual marginal rate of substitution curve with the marginal cost curve since an externality emerges for the consumption of other.

Thus, it is necessary to first calculate the total marginal rate of substitution and, consequently, find the intersection with the marginal cost curve. As in the case of public goods, the total marginal rate of substitution is calculated by the summation of individual marginal rates of substitution. But in the case of positional goods, one marginal rate of substitution is subtracted since there is negative consumption. Therefore, the total marginal rate of substitution is the difference between the two individual marginal rates of substitution.

== See also ==
- Conspicuous consumption
- Expenditure cascades
- Status symbol
- Veblen good
- Zero-sum game
