= Henry Porter (journalist) =

English author and journalist

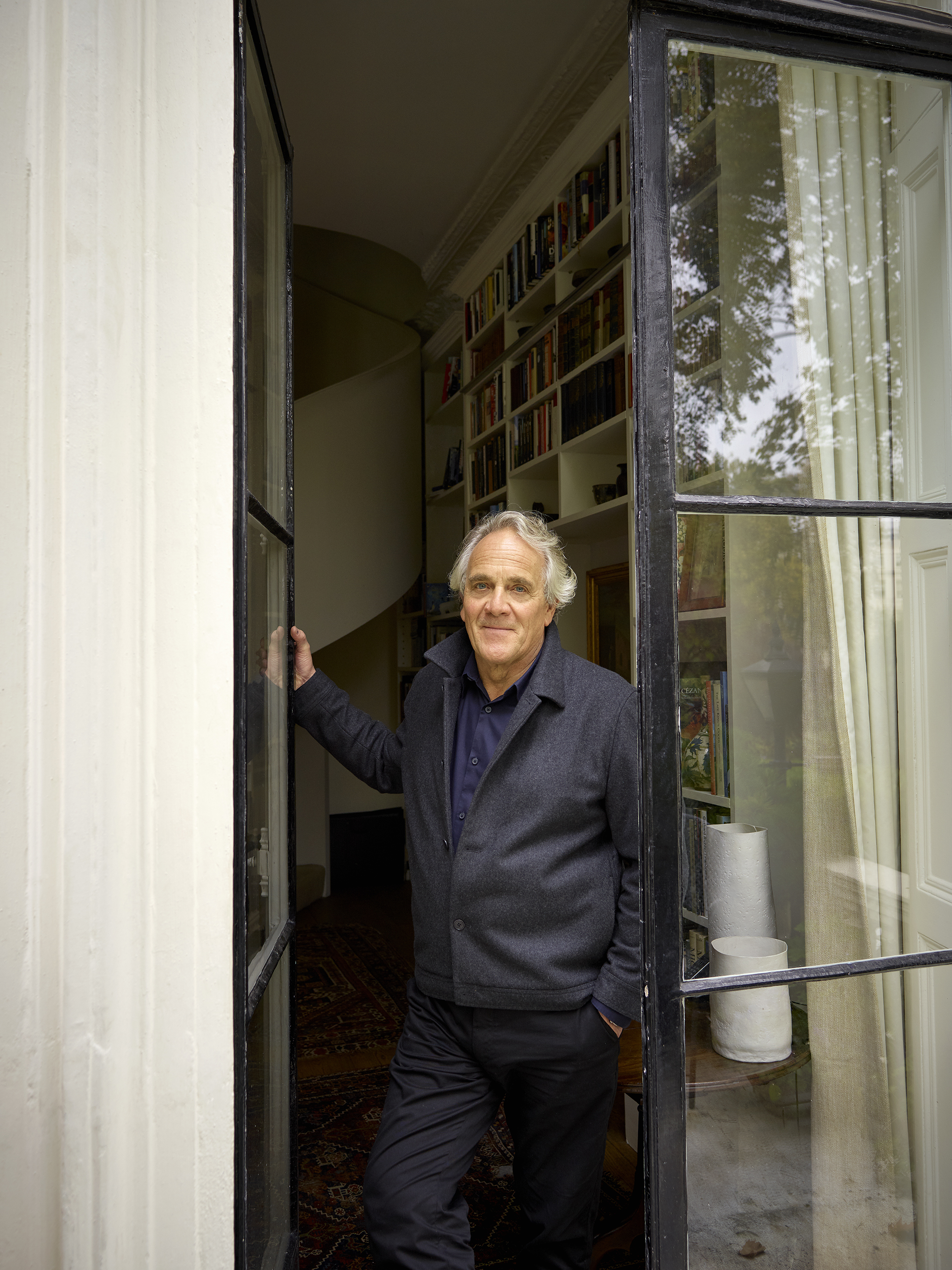

Henry Porter (born 1953) is an English author and journalist. He is a writer of award-winning thrillers and was, until 2014, a regular columnist for The Observer, focusing on civil liberties and the threat to democracy. He is also an activist, chairing the Joint Media Unit of the People’s Vote campaign (until 2019) and The Convention, which stages large scale political conferences. Until 2018, he was the British editor of Vanity Fair, a position he held for 25 years. He has written ten novels, including a children’s book. The third part of a quartet of thrillers, The Old Enemy, was published in April 2021.

== Early life ==
Porter was born into a military family. His father was the fifth generation to serve in the King's Royal Rifle Corps. His early years were spent in Germany and a succession of Army camps. He was educated at a village school in Worcestershire, a prep school he heartily loathed, Wellington College, and the University of Manchester.

== Activism and events ==
In 2005, Porter set up the West London Tsunami Appeal, which, in two weeks, raised £70K that was distributed in areas devastated by the Indian Ocean earthquake and tsunami on 26 December 2004.

In 2008, Porter co-founded the Convention on Modern Liberty with Anthony Barnett. They co-directed the event, which was held on 28 February 2009 at the Logan Hall in London and in parallel meetings across the country. Speakers included the writer Philip Pullman, the former Lord Chief Justice, Lord Bingham, the former Director of Public Prosecutions, Lord MacDonald QC and Conservative MP David Davis and the former Attorney General Lord Goldsmith QC.

In November 2013, he part-funded and directed the Snowden debates at the Jarvis Auditorium in the Royal Institute of British Architects, London. The event was designed to explore the implications of the global surveillance disclosures by the NSA contractor Edward Snowden, published by, among others, the Guardian during the summer of 2013.

On 12–13 May 2017, Porter put on Convention on Brexit and the Political Crash at Central Hall, Westminster with speakers as diverse as Bob Geldof, Michael Gove, Akala, Alastair Campbell, and Jarvis Cocker. In 2018, he staged two similar events at the Emmanuel Centre in London.

== Political positions ==
Porter describes his politics as centre-left. In the 2010 General Election, he was one of a number of well-known writers to support the Liberal Democrats, and, in the years running up to that election, he contributed to the party's thinking on the threat of intrusive surveillance and the ID card.

In 2016, he was strongly in favour of Britain remaining in the EU. On the day after the referendum, he wrote "As I explained to my Brexit friends in a blog post this week, I would be a very sore loser if we came out. I will be in mourning for a project that was as brave and beautiful as anything in European history". He was later a member of the Labour Party and supported a progressive alliance to take the country forward after Brexit.

== Awards ==
He was on the Orwell Prize's journalism shortlist for 2009 for his campaigning work on civil liberties at The Observer. His novel Brandenburg, set at the time of the fall of the Berlin Wall in 1989, which he covered as a journalist, won the Ian Fleming Steel Dagger Award. Empire State and the Dying Light were shortlisted for the same award. Firefly, which is set on the migrant trail in 2015 and is the first in a quartet of contemporary thrillers, won the Wilbur Smith Adventure Writing Prize. The second book in the series, White Hot Silence, was nominated as one of the best thrillers published in the United States in 2020 in the Barry Awards.

== Personal life ==
Porter is married to Liz Elliot, Editor-at-Large for House and Garden, whom he met when they both worked at Private Eye magazine in the 1970s. They have two adult daughters. Porter is a keen artist and draftsman.

In 2015, he was surprised to find himself elected as the President of Cricket Club at Birlingham, Worcestershire, whose ground he inherited from his father Harry Porter in 2014.

== Bibliography ==
=== Standalone works ===
- Remembrance Day (2000)
- The Dying Light (2009) (published as The Bell Ringers in the US, 2010)
- The Enigma Girl (2024)

=== Robert Harland trilogy ===
- A Spy's Life (2001)
- Empire State (2003)
- Brandenburg (2005)

=== Paul Samson triology ===
- Firefly (2018)
- White Hot Silence (2019)
- The Old Enemy (2021)

=== Skirl trilogy ===
- The Master of the Fallen Chairs (2008)
