= Robert Rowthorn =

British academic

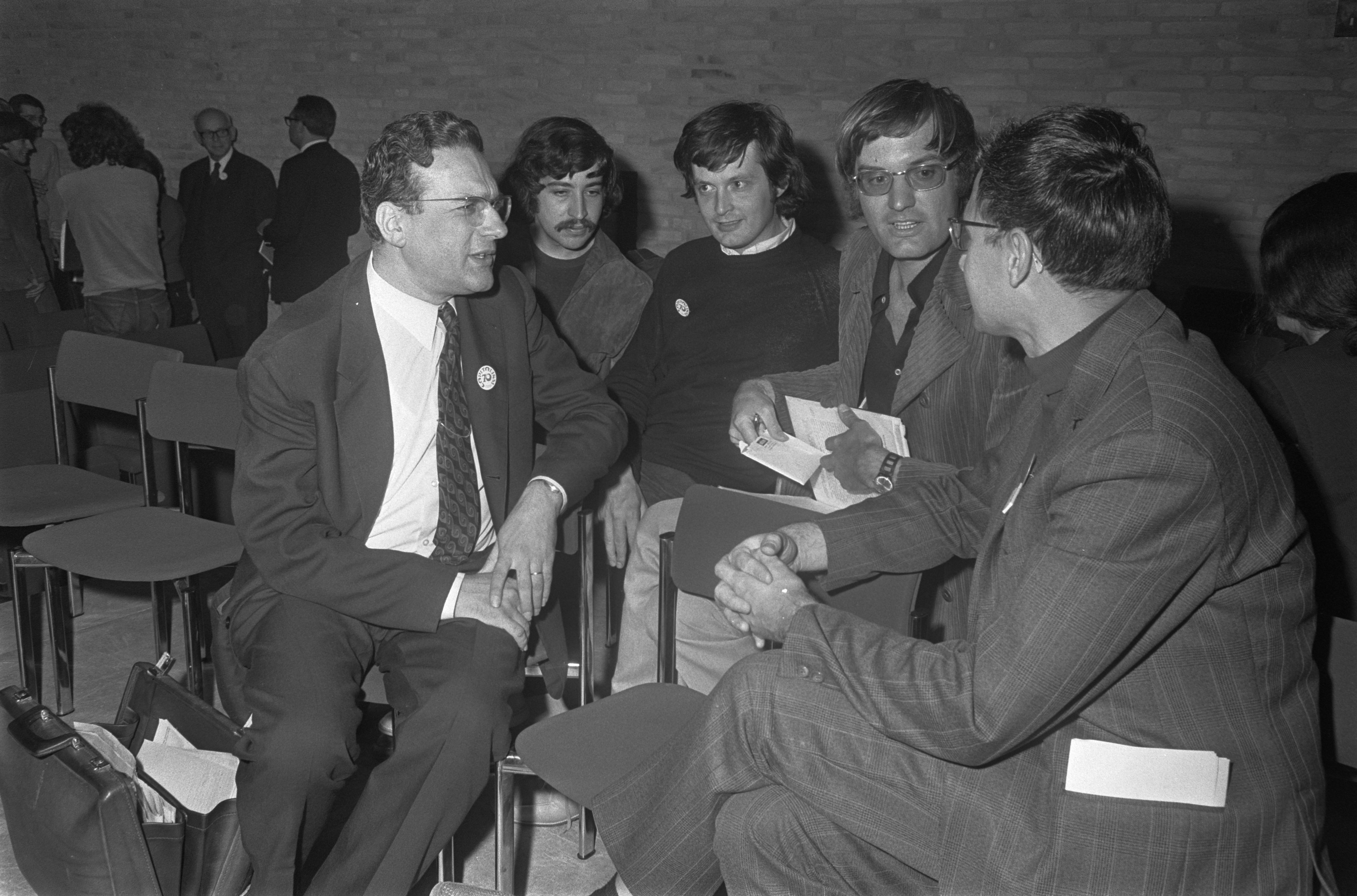
- Congress on Capitalism in the seventies, Tilburg, the Netherlands (1970). Left to right: Ernest Mandel, Herbert Gintis, Bob Rowthorn, Elmar Altvater and organiser Theo van de Klundert
- Born: 20 August 1939 (age 87); Newport, Monmouthshire, Wales, UK

Academic background
- Education: Jesus College, Oxford; University of California, Berkeley; University of Oxford
- Influences: Karl Marx

Academic work
- School or tradition: Marxian economics
- Institutions: University of Cambridge

Robert Rowthorn FAcSS FLSW (born 20 August 1939) is Emeritus Professor of Economics at the University of Cambridge and has been elected as a Life Fellow of King’s College. He is also a senior research fellow of the Centre for Population Research at the Department of Social Policy and Intervention, University of Oxford.

== Life ==
Rowthorn was born in 1939 in Newport, Monmouthshire, Wales. He attended Jesus College, Oxford reading mathematics. He took a post-graduate research fellowship at Berkeley, again in mathematics. He returned to Oxford and switched to economics, taking a two-year B.Phil. He then worked at Cambridge as an economist.

He was an editor of the radical newspaper The Black Dwarf.

He wrote many books and academic articles on economic growth, structural change and employment. His work was influenced by Karl Marx and critics of capitalism. He was a consultant to various UK government departments and private sector firms and organisations, and to international organisations such as the International Monetary Fund, the United Nations Conference on Trade and Development (UNCTAD) and the International Labour Organization. Many of his publications have a Marxist slant.

Rowthorn has been described by Susan Strange as being one of the few Marxists (another being Stephen Hymer) who is read in business schools.

Among other things, he has identified the so-called paradox of costs, whereby higher real wages lead to higher profit margins.

In 2011, Rowthorn was elected a Fellow of the Learned Society of Wales.

== Selected works ==
=== Books ===
- Rowthorn, Bob (1980). Capitalism, conflict, and inflation: essays in political economy. London: Lawrence and Wishart. ISBN 9780853155393.
- Rowthorne, Bob (Autumn 1981). Demand real wages and economic growth. London: Thames Polytechnic. ISBN 9780902169173. Thames Papers in Political Economy.
- Rowthorn, Robert E.; Wells, J.R. (1987). De-industrialization and foreign trade. Cambridge Cambridgeshire New York: Cambridge University Press. ISBN 9780521263603.
- Rowthorn, Robert E.; Ramaswamy, Ramana (September 1997). "Deindustrialization – its causes and implications". IMF Working Paper. International Monetary Fund. WP/97/42. Pdf.

=== Book chapters ===
- Rowthorn, Robert E. (1994), "What remains of Kaldor's Law?", in King, John E. (ed.), Economic growth in theory and practice: a Kaldorian perspective, Aldershot, England; Brookfield, Vermont: E. Elgar Pub, pp. 347–356, ISBN 9781852789558.
- Rowthorn, Robert E. (1994), "A reply to Lord Kaldor's Comment", in King, John E. (ed.), Economic growth in theory and practice: a Kaldorian perspective, Aldershot, England; Brookfield, Vermont: E. Elgar Pub, pp. 363–367, ISBN 9781852789558.
- Rowthorn, Robert E. (1994), "A note on Verdoorn's Law", in King, John E. (ed.), Economic growth in theory and practice: a Kaldorian perspective, Aldershot, England; Brookfield, Vermont: E. Elgar Pub, pp. 385–387, ISBN 9781852789558.
- Rowthorn, Robert E. (2000), "Conflict, inflation and money", in Junankar, P. N. (ed.), The economics of unemployment, The International Library of Critical Writings in Economics, volume 122, Cheltenham, UK; Northampton, Massachusetts: Edward Elgar Pub, pp. 119–143, ISBN 9781858982366.

=== Journal articles ===
- Rowthorn, Robert E. (March 1975). "What remains of Kaldor's Law?". The Economic Journal. 85 (337): 10–19. doi:10.2307/2230525. JSTOR 2230525.

Kaldor, Nicholas (December 1975). "Economic growth and the Verdoorn Law - a comment on Mr Rowthorn's article". The Economic Journal. 85 (340): 891–896. doi:10.2307/2230633. JSTOR 2230633.
Rowthorn, Robert E. (December 1975). "A reply to Lord Kaldor's comment". The Economic Journal. 85 (340): 897–901. doi:10.2307/2230634. JSTOR 2230634.

- Rowthorn, Robert E. (September 1977). "Conflict, inflation and money". Cambridge Journal of Economics. 1 (3). Oxford Journals: 215–239.
- Rowthorn, Robert E. (March 1979). "A note on Verdoorn's Law". The Economic Journal. 89 (353): 131–133. doi:10.2307/2231413. JSTOR 2231413.
- Rowthorn, Robert E.; Wells, J.R. (June 1990). "Reply to Grazia letto-Gillies' 'Was deindustrialization in the UK inevitable? Some comments on the Rowthorn-Wells analysis' and Paul Auerbach's review of Rowthorn-Wells in International Review of Applied Economics". International Review of Applied Economics. 4 (2): 224–235. doi:10.1080/758523676.

In response to: letto-Gillies, Grazia (June 1990). "Was deindustrialization in the UK inevitable? Some comments on the Rowthorn-Wells analysis". International Review of Applied Economics. 4 (2): 209–223. doi:10.1080/758523675.
and: Auerbach, Paul (January 1989). "Review: Rowthorn, R.E. and Wells, J.R. 1987: De-industrialization and foreign trade". International Review of Applied Economics. 3 (1): 115–121. doi:10.1080/758532015.

- Rowthorn, Robert; Ramaswamy, Ramana (November 1991). "Efficiency wages and wage dispersion". Economica. 58 (232): 501–514. doi:10.2307/2554695. JSTOR 2554695.
- Rowthorn, Robert E. (March 1992). "Intra-industry trade and investment under oligopoly: the role of market size". The Economic Journal. 102 (411): 402–414. doi:10.2307/2234524. JSTOR 2234524.
- Rowthorn, Robert E. (May 1992). "Centralisation, employment and wage dispersion". The Economic Journal. 102 (412): 506–523. doi:10.2307/2234288. JSTOR 2234288.
- Rowthorn, Robert E. (December 1992). "A Review of W. J. Baumol, S. A. B. Blackman and E. N. Wolff, Productivity and American Leadership: The Long View". Review of Income and Wealth. 38 (4): 475–495. doi:10.1111/j.1475-4991.1992.tb00456.x. Pdf.
- Rowthorn, Robert; Pagano, Ugo (December 1994). "Ownership, technology and institutional stability". Structural Change and Economic Dynamics. 5 (2): 221–242. doi:10.1016/0954-349X(94)90003-5. S2CID 154401089. SSRN 934387.
- Rowthorn, Robert E.; Ramaswamy, Ramana (March 1999). "Growth, trade, and deindustrialization". IMF Staff Papers. 46 (1). International Monetary Fund: 18–41. doi:10.2307/3867633. JSTOR 3867633. Pdf.
- Rowthorn, Robert E. (September 2009). "Returns to scale and the economic impact of migration: some new considerations". Spatial Economic Analysis. 4 (3): 329–341. Bibcode:2009SpEA....4..329R. doi:10.1080/17421770903114729. S2CID 154613561.

== Notes ==
Awards
Preceded by G. A. Cohen	Deutscher Memorial Prize; 1980	Succeeded by Neil Harding
