= Anthony Barnett (writer) =

British writer and campaigner (born 1942)

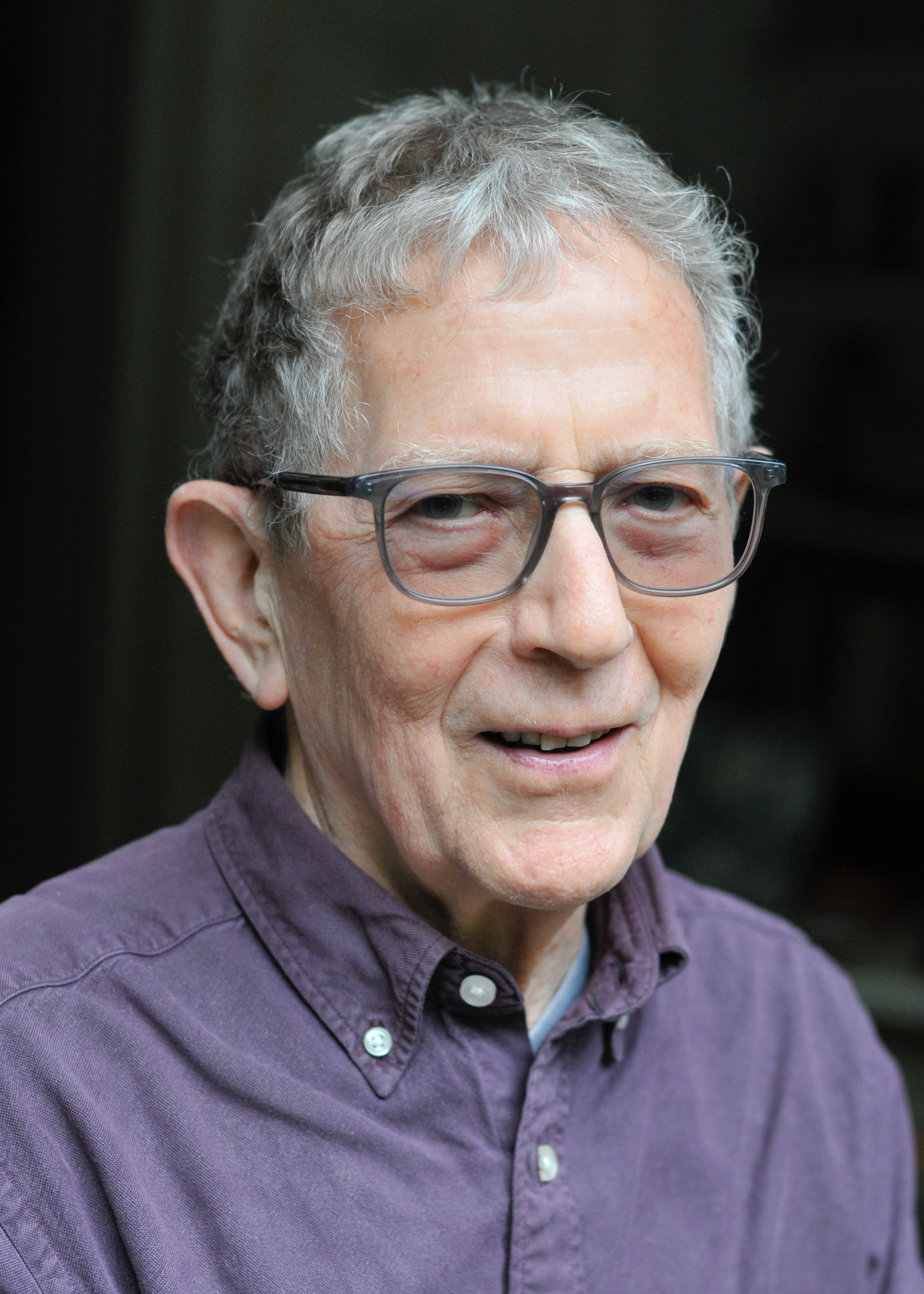
- Barnett in 2024
- Born: November 1942 (age 83–84)
- Education: Cambridge University
- Occupation: Journalist
- Known for: Co-founder of openDemocracy
- Partner: Judith Herrin
- Children: 2, inc. Tamara Barnett-Herrin

Anthony Barnett (born November 1942) is a modern English writer and campaigner. He was a co-founder of openDemocracy in 2001.

== Biography ==
Barnett grew up in Edgware. He was a student at Cambridge University, where he was active in the Labour Club, and lodged with Nicholas Kaldor. He did an MA Sociology at Leicester University (1965–1967), where he worked with Norbert Elias.

He was a member of the Editorial Committee of New Left Review from 1965 to 1983. He helped create and coordinate the weekly publication 7 Days (1971–1972). Its papers are part of the Anthony Barnett archive in the British Library.

He was a Fellow of the Transnational Institute from 1974 to 1984 and remains a contributor

Barnett bid to be the editor of the New Statesman in 1986, supported by John Berger, Angela Carter, James Curran, Tom Nairn, Salman Rushdie, Joan Smith, Marina Warner and Francis Wheen. He wrote an account of what happened called 'The twots'

Barnett has written for the New Statesman, The Guardian, Prospect. and Byline Times. Between February 1984 and December 1985, he wrote the New Statesman diary, under the name "Islander", using an early personal computer. His articles included "The Last Good War (1939-1945)" written in May 1985 and finally "Islander's Farewell" on 20 December 1985.

He conceived the television film England's Henry Moore (1988), which concerned the sculptor's co-option by the British establishment.

Barnett was the first Director of Charter 88 from 1988 to 1995, the movement for constitutional reform including a written constitution.

He founded openDemocracy, launched in 2001, with Paul Hilder, Susie Richards and David Hayes, and was its editor and then its first editor-in-chief until 2007. He was a member of the Board of openDemocracy Ltd from 1999 to 2023, and he remains a regular contributor to the website. He wrote a history of the website 'openDemocracy versus the status quo' on its 25th anniversary.

Barnett, with Henry Porter, was co-director of the Convention on Modern Liberty (2008–2009), the largest civil liberties gathering ever held in the UK.

Barnett is the author of several books, including Iron Britannia, Why Parliament Waged its Falklands War (first published by Allison & Busby in 1982 and reissued by Faber Finds in 2012. In 2016, he serialised Blimey it could be Brexit! about the forces behind the vote, publishing a chapter a week in openDemocracy in the run-up to Britain's 2016 EU referendum. His in-depth evaluation was published by Unbound in 2017 with the title The Lure of Greatness: England's Brexit and America's Trump. In 2022, Barnett published Taking Control!: Humanity and America after Trump and the Pandemic with Repeater Books, on the possibilities of a progressive future.

Barnett was awarded an honorary doctorate from The Open University in September 2013, and an honorary doctorate from Goldsmiths University in 2019, when his speech to graduates concluded:

"In these dire times asking what you can do for others is the best way to reach out for yourself. This is what Martin Luther King was seeking when he called for the world to be governed by a love that does justice. Cooperation is harder but much more rewarding than competition. It means refusing both to be a victim and to make others your victim. It means sharing your feelings without being ruled by emotion; having empathy for the feeling of others when you don't share them. It means not closing down your identities, for we all have more than one, but allowing them to change and grow. It means using the facility of our digital age to be a co-creator of society and never just a consumer. It means always using the power of your intelligence, including your emotional intelligence, to make the call that matters, to ask what we can do for others – with love and justice.

Barnett made a short film in 2022 on American politics, US Progressives on a Knife Edge, and in August 2024 he wrote an article entitled "Switch It Off!" in The Washington Spectator, about the dangers of surveillance. He writes a monthly column, "Notes on Now", in Byline Times.

He was profiled in an interview with Jason Cowley for the New Statesman in November 2025.

Anthony Barnett is a trustee of The openTrust, a director of Abolish Westminster Ltd and an advisor to Our House.

== Personal life ==
Barnett lives with his partner Judith Herrin; the couple have two daughters, the singer Tamara Barnett-Herrin and Portia Barnett-Herrin.

== Bibliography ==
- Barnett, Anthony & John Pilger (1982). Aftermath : the struggle of Cambodia & Vietnam. London: New Statesman.
- Iron Britannia, Why Parliament Waged its Falklands War (1982), ISBN 978-0-85031-493-9
- Soviet Freedom (1988), ISBN 978-0-09-175871-4
- Debating the Constitution (1992), with Caroline Ellis and Paul Hirst, ISBN 978-0-7456-1199-0
- Power and the Throne (1994), drawn from the Charter 88 monarchy debate, ISBN 978-0-09-939311-5
- This Time - Our Constitutional Revolution (1997), ISBN 978-0-09-926858-1
- Town and Country (1999), edited with Roger Scruton, ISBN 978-0-224-05254-2
- The Athenian Option, Radical reform of the House of Lords, with Peter Carty (2008), ISBN 978-1-84540-139-9
- Barnett, Anthony (22 March 2016). Blimey, it Could be Brexit! . openDemocracy – via Creative Commons Attribution-NonCommercial 4.0 International licence.
- The Lure of Greatness: England's Brexit and America's Trump (2017), ISBN 978-1-78352-453-2
- Taking Control!: Humanity and America After Trump and the Pandemic (2022), ISBN 9781914420269
- David Chandler & Anthony Barnett (2024). The Uncrowned King of Cambodia - The Life of Lt Col E D (Moke) Murray. Australia: Kerr Publishing Pty Ltd, Melbourne, Victoria. ISBN 978-1-87-570359-3.

=== Introductions and forewords ===
- Introduction to Architect or Bee? by Mike Cooley, Hogarth Press, 1987; ISBN 9780701207694
- "A Fight For The Future". Foreword to Fight Back! A Reader in the Winter of Protest, edited by Dan Hancox, openDemocracy, February 2011, ISBN 978-0-9556775-9-5.
- Foreword to The Long Revolution by Raymond Williams, Parthian Books, 2011, ISBN 978-1-908069-71-9
- Introduction to The Break-Up of Britain by Tom Nairn, Verso, Third Edition 2021, ISBN 978-1-78168-320-0

=== Essays ===
- "Class Struggle and the Heath Government", New Left Review, January/February 1973.
- "Raymond Williams and Marxism: A Rejoinder to Terry Eagleton", New Left Review, September/October 1976.
- "'Cambodia Will Never Disappear'", New Left Review, March/April 1990.
- "Corporate Populism and Partyless Democracy", New Left Review, May/June 2000.
- "Sorry, David, you're not the man to lead Labour. The elder Miliband continues to defend an appalling breach of trust over Iraq" . New Statesman, 8 September 2010.
- "Can Miliband speak for England? The rise of Nigel Farage and Ukip is both a danger and an opportunity" New Statesman, 24 September 2013.
- "'The twots': Letter from a would-be New Statesman Editor" New Statesman, 26 September 2015.
- "Democracy and the machinations of mind control" . NYR Daily, The New York Review of Books, 14 December 2017.
- "COVID-19 and the End of Economic Fatalism", Byline Times, 9 October 2020.
- "The Storming of the Capitol – Part One: Trump's Red Guards", Byline Times, 11 January 2021.
- "The Storming of the Capitol – Part Two: The Finale of the Sixties", Byline Times, 13 January 2021.
- "The Storming of the Capitol – Part Three: From 9/11 to Insurrection", Byline Times, 26 March 2021.
- "Six months that launched the Seventies", British Library Social Science blog. 25 November 2021.
- "The lure of Lexit must be resisted – socialism in one country is a fantasy. Much of the left still must learn that the existing British state is the prison of their hopes", New Statesman, 12 October 2023.
- "What is Starmer's story? England's summer riots have violently exposed the failure to resolve our national question", New Statesman, 31 August 2024.
- "Harris v Trump: This US election marks a fork in world history". openDemocracy. 24 October 2024.
- "Who can answer the English Question?" New Statesman, 4 December 2024.
