= Fred Hirsch (economist) =

Austrian economist

Fred Hirsch (6 July 1931 – 10 January 1978) was an Austrian-born British heterodox economist and professor of international studies at the University of Warwick. He authored the economic concept of positional good.

== Biography ==
He was born in Vienna. In 1934, after the Austrian Civil War, his family emigrated to Britain. Hirsch graduated with first class honours from the London School of Economics in 1952 before working as a financial journalist on The Banker and The Economist (financial editor, 1963–1966). He was a senior adviser to the International Monetary Fund, from 1966 to 1972 where he worked on international monetary problems.

Afterwards he spent two years as a research fellow at Nuffield College, Oxford, from 1972 to 1974, where he started working on his book The Social Limits to Growth (RKP, 1977), having previously written The Pound Sterling: A Polemic (V Gollancz, 1965), Money International (Allen Lane, The Penguin Press, 1967), and Newspaper Money: Fleet Street and the search for the affluent reader (with David Gordon) (Hutchinson, 1975) . In 1975 he joined the University of Warwick as Professor of International Studies. A year later he developed amyotrophic lateral sclerosis leading to his death on 10 January 1978.

== Limits to Growth ==
Hirsch's most influential book concerned the inherent limits to growth, including both the concept of positional goods and what he called the 'commercialisation effect'.

=== Positional goods ===
The concept of positional goods helps explain why, as Hirsch told the New York Times, material growth can "no longer deliver what has long been promised for it - to make everyone middle-class". Positional goods are those that derive their value specifically from their scarcity - cannot be distributed more widely as the doing so would undermine their construction of high status value.

Hirsch's concept helps explains why, as economic growth improves overall quality of life at any particular level, doing "better" than how your grandparents lived does not translate automatically into doing "well", if there are as many or more people ahead of you in the economic hierarchy. For example, if you are the first in your family to get a college degree, you are doing better. But if you were at the bottom of your class at a weak school, you may find yourself less eligible for a job than your grandfather, who was only a high school graduate. "The value to me of my education - the satisfaction I derive from it - depends upon how much education the man ahead of me in the job line has."

=== Commercialization effect ===
Hirsch also highlighted the danger that the quality of a product/service was diminished as a result of supplying it commercially (something perhaps most obvious in the case of sex); market exchange – as for example with gift giving – diminishes the inherent value of the transaction by subordinating social well-being to the commodification impulse.

Michael J. Sandel has recently echoed Hirsch in challenging the belief that the commercialization process does not affect the product in question, highlighting the importance of what Hirsch called "the effect on the characteristics of a product or activity of supplying it exclusively or predominantly on commercial terms rather than on some other basis – such as informal exchange, mutual obligation, altruism or love, or feelings of service or obligation"

== See also ==
- Easterlin paradox
- Motivation crowding theory
- Neoliberalism
- Richard Titmuss
