= Electoral reform by country =

Change in electoral systems

Electoral reform is a change in electoral systems that alters how public desires, usually expressed by cast votes, produce election results.

== By country ==
=== Albania ===
In 2020, a 1 percent electoral threshold was set and the election campaign financing law was reformed in Albania.

=== Australia ===
The Proportional Representation Society of Australia advocates the single transferable vote and proportional representation.

STV is currently used to elect the upper house at the national level and in four states, and the lower house in two states.

=== Canada ===
Several national and provincial organizations promote electoral reform, especially by advocating more party-proportional representation, as most regions of Canada have at least three competitive political parties (some four or five) and the traditional first-past-the-post election system operates best where just two parties are competing. The leading alternatives to first past the post currently are STV, mixed-member proportional representation (MMP; uses both single-member districts and top-up seats), and rural–urban proportional representation (which combines STV in multi-member districts, single member districts and top-up seats). Others are dual-member PR, local PR and list PR in multi-member districts. These PR systems emphasize either proportional allocation of seats to parties (or their candidates) or a high rate of effective votes (votes actually used to elect someone), through transfers away from where initially placed if that means they would be wasted (STV) or through many parties electing representation (most forms of PR). Both proportionality and a raised rate of effective votes result, whichever strategy is emphasized.

The Constitution of Canada prevents votes from moving across provincial borders, so without constitutional change, no overall proportionality can be guaranteed. Multi-member districts are currently prohibited, but that is at the discretion of the Parliament of Canada. Federal elections, as well as elections in every province, have used multi-member districts in the past. Historically, all electoral systems used in Canada have allowed voters to cast a vote (or votes) only for a specific candidate (or candidates); casting a vote for a party list has never been done in Canada.

There are several electoral reform advocacy groups. Fair Vote Canada is a large non-party organization advocating electoral reform nationally. The Equal Vote Coalition has organized a multi-year research campaign involving many of the world experts on electoral reform.

The Election Districts Voting organization advocates a particular form of proportional representation where a vote is used in successively larger districts. The plan is intended to ensure large majorities of voters directly elect party candidates of choice, not just parties of choice.

Canada has not always used the single-winner first-past-the-post system that is now ubiquitous. As recently as the 1990s, plurality block voting was in use. The provinces of Manitoba and Alberta used proportional representation (single transferable voting) to elect some of their members of the Legislative Assembly from the 1920s to the 1950s. Since Canadian Confederation, the franchise has been extended to give the vote to women and to adults of races or ethnic groups previously barred from voting,status Indians and adults younger than 21. So far none of those changes have followed a referendum, with the sole exception being extension of the franchise to (some) women in British Columbia in 1916.

Several referendums to decide whether or not to adopt proportional representation have been held at the provincial level since 2005. None thus far has resulted in a change from the plurality system. The referendum threshold for adoption of new voting systems has regularly been set at a "supermajority": for example, 60 percent of ballots cast approving the change in order for the change to be implemented. In most provincial referendums, the change side received less than 40 percent support. But in two cases, a majority of voters voted for change.

In the 2005 electoral reform referendum held in British Columbia, a majority of votes were cast in favour of change to STV, but the government did not assent to the public will.

In the November 7, 2016, electoral reform plebiscite on Prince Edward Island, the government declined to specify in advance how it would use the results. Mixed-member proportional representation won the five-option instant-runoff voting contest, taking 55 percent of the final vote versus 45 percent for first-past-the-post. The PEI government did not implement a proportional voting system, saying the turnout of only 36 percent made it "doubtful whether these results can be said to constitute a clear expression of the will of Prince Edward Islanders". PEI regularly sees turnout above 80 percent in most elections.

As of 2025, seven provincial level referendums on electoral reform have been held:

- 2005 British Columbia electoral reform referendum
- 2005 Prince Edward Island electoral reform referendum
- 2007 Ontario electoral reform referendum
- 2009 British Columbia electoral reform referendum
- 2016 Prince Edward Island electoral reform referendum
- 2018 British Columbia electoral reform referendum
- 2019 Prince Edward Island electoral reform referendum

During the 2015 federal election, all three major opposition parties – the Liberals, the NDP and the Greens – promised some measure of electoral reform before the next federal election. The NDP promised to implement mixed-member proportional representation with regional (sub-provincial) districting and open lists, based on the 2004 recommendations of the Law Commission.

The Liberal leader at the time, Justin Trudeau, promised to make the 2015 election the last that would use first-past-the-post. He promised, if elected, to form an all-party committee to investigate various electoral reform options "including proportional representation, ranked ballots, mandatory voting and online voting". Trudeau admitted that in 2015, he preferred a winner-take-all, preferential voting system known as instant-runoff voting. Despite his misgivings about proportional representation, Trudeau promised he would approach the issue with an open mind.

Many prominent members of his caucus and cabinet (including Stéphane Dion, Dominic Leblanc, and Chrystia Freeland) stated they supported proportional representation. In 2012, Dion authored an editorial for the National Post advocating his variation of proportional representation by the single transferable vote dubbed "P3" (proportional, preferential and personalized).

Conservative Party interim leader Rona Ambrose indicated a willingness to investigate electoral reform options. Her party's stated position was that any reform must first be approved by the voters in a referendum. After its election to a plurality of seats in the House of Commons, the Liberal government stated a referendum was unnecessary as Liberals clearly campaigned on making "2015 Canada's last First Past the Post election".

The Green Party of Canada has long been supportive of proportional representation. At the party's special general meeting in Calgary on December 5, 2016, Green Party members passed a resolution endorsing mixed-member proportional representation as its preferred model, while maintaining an openness to any proportional voting system producing an outcome with a score of 5 or less on the Gallagher Index.

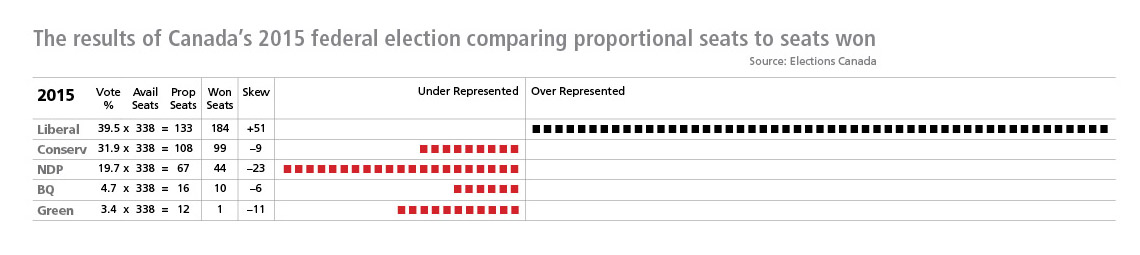
2015 Canadian election: seats do not reflect the popular vote

Liberal members of the Standing Committee on Electoral Reform urged Prime Minister Justin Trudeau to break his promise to change Canada's voting system before the next federal election in 2019. Meanwhile, NDP and Green members of the committee pressured Trudeau to keep the commitment. In its final report, Strengthening Democracy in Canada, (December 2016) the Standing Committee on Electoral Reform recommended the government design a proportional election system and hold a national referendum to gauge Canadians' support.

Between December 2016 and January 2017, the Government of Canada undertook a survey of Canadian opinion regarding electoral reform, with some 360,000 responses received.

On February 1, 2017, the Liberal Minister of Democratic Institutions, Karina Gould, announced that a change of voting system was no longer in her mandate, citing a lack of broad consensus among Canadians on what voting system would be best.

The Province of Ontario permitted the use of instant runoff voting, often called the "ranked ballot", for municipal elections. IRV is not a proportional voting system and is opposed by both Fair Vote Canada and Election Districts Voting for provincial or federal elections. The Ontario government later rescinded this legislation, and municipalities use a plurality system (either first past the post or plurality block voting) for all elections.

=== Czech Republic ===
The electoral threshold for multi-party coalitions was reduced due to a court ruling from 10 percent to 8 percent for two-party coalitions in 2021.

=== Denmark ===
The Danish electoral system was reformed from first-past-the-post voting to the additional member system in 1915 and in 1920 to proportional representation (a form of mixed-member proportional) with list PR used at the district level and list PR also used to allocate overall at-large top-up seats.

=== European Union ===
A minimum electoral threshold of 3.5 percent has been proposed by the European Parliament. A minimum electoral threshold is considered unconstitutional by German courts and was not applied in Germany. Transnational party-lists have been proposed for the European parliament elections.

=== Georgia ===
Changes to the constitution of Georgia in 2017 reformed the presidential election to an indirect election through an electoral college starting with the 2024 Georgian presidential election.

=== Germany ===
In 1953 the federal state electoral threshold was replaced with a national electoral threshold, reducing party fragmentation. In 1972 the voting age was lowered from 21 to 18. In 1987, the seat allocation method was switched from the D'Hondt method to largest remainder method and was switched again in 2009, to Webster/Sainte-Laguë method, due to concerns of lower proportionality for small parties.

The 2013 the compensation mechanism was adjusted to reduce the negative vote weight in compensating between federal states.

In 2023, the German Parliament adopted a federal electoral law reform which replaced the flexible number of seats with a fixed size of 630 seats and removed the provision which allowed parties which won at least 3 single-member seats to be exempt from the 5 percent electoral threshold.

=== Greece ===
In 2016, the majority bonus system was replaced with proportional representation, applying only after next election. In 2020, proportional representation was replaced with the majority bonus system, applying only after next election.

=== Hungary ===
In 2012, a mixed-member majoritarian voting system with a combination of parallel and positive vote transfer was introduced.

=== India ===
Electoral bonds allowing anonymous contributions to political parties were introduced in 2017, and the limit on financial contributions by companies was removed.

=== Iraq ===
In 2020, the proportional representation with modified Sainte-Laguë method for seat allocation was reformed to single non-transferable vote.

=== Israel ===
There is continuous talk in Israel about "governability" ("משילות" in Hebrew). The following reforms were carried in the last three decades:

1. Between 1996 and 2001, the PM was elected directly, while keeping a strong parliament. Direct election for the PM was abandoned afterwards, amid disappointment with the change. The earlier Westminster system was reinstated like it was before.
2. The minimum threshold a party needs to enter parliament was gradually raised. It was 1 percent until 1988; it was then raised to 1.5 percent and remained at that level until 2003, when it was again raised to 2 percent. On March 11, 2014, the Knesset approved a new law to raise the threshold to 3.25 percent (approximately 4 seats).
3. The process of throwing off an existing coalition government was slowly made harder, and now it is nearly impossible to impeach a government without triggering a new election. As of 2015, one needs to present a full new government with a majority support in order to impeach a government. This too, was done gradually between 1996 and 2014.

=== Italy ===
Italian electoral reforms include the Italian electoral law of 2017, the Italian electoral law of 2015, the Italian electoral law of 2005 and the Italian electoral law of 1993.

=== Lesotho ===
Lesotho reformed in 2002 to a mixed-member proportional representation, where parties could choose to not run for either constituency seats or party-list seats. This prevented the compensatory mechanism and effectively resulted in parallel voting. Further reform in 2012 introduced mixed single-voting, forcing parties to run for both constituency seats or party-list seats and improving the proportionality.

=== Mongolia ===
In 2019, the electoral law for Mongolian legislative elections was changed to plurality-at-large voting. The new electoral law barred people found guilty of "corrupt practices" from standing in elections, marginalized smaller parties, and effectively removed the right of Mongolian expatriates to vote, as they could not be registered in a specific constituency.

=== New Zealand ===
Electoral reform in New Zealand began in 1986 with the report of the Royal Commission on the Electoral System entitled Towards A Better Democracy. The Royal Commission recommended that Mixed Member Proportional (MMP) be adopted instead of the current first-past-the-post system. After two referendums in 1992 and 1993, New Zealand adopted MMP. In 2004, some local body elections in New Zealand were elected using single transferable vote instead of the block vote.

=== Slovakia ===
The election silence period, where opinion polls are banned before elections, was extended in Slovakia in 2019 from 14 to 50 days, one of the longest blackout periods in the world. The Slovak courts considered this change unconstitutional. In 2022, this blackout period was reduced to 48 hours.

=== South Africa ===
In 1948, when the National Party won a majority of seats with only a minority of votes, it instituted a herrenvolk democracy and prevented blacks from voting. With the end of apartheid in 1994, South Africa switched to more universal suffrage and a form of proportional representation. Since 1994, successive commissions recommended electoral reform for South Africa. Following the 2024 election, the Electoral Reform Consultation Panel saw a need to bring representatives closer to voters and recommended reducing the size of districts. The districts are the provinces themselves and their representation ranges from 5 seats to 47 seats.

=== South Korea ===
South Korea reformed in 2019 from parallel voting to mixed-member proportional representation. The formation of satellite parties reduced the effectiveness of this reform.

=== Taiwan ===
Taiwan reformed 2008 from the single non-transferable vote to parallel voting. A constitutional referendum was held 2022 to reduce the voting age from 20 to 18.

=== Thailand ===
Thailand changed electoral systems in 2019, moving from parallel voting to a mixed-member proportional representation system with a mixed single vote. Further reform in 2021 restored the parallel voting system and removed the proportional representation mechanism.

=== United Kingdom ===
The United Kingdom has generally used first-past-the-post (FPTP) for many years, but historically many constituencies elected two MPs, and other systems were used to elect a few of its parliament's members. Its last multi-member district at the national level was disbanded in 1948. Most members in the multi-member district were elected through block voting. Limited voting was used to elect some of its members starting in 1867. The passage of the Great Reform Bill of 1832 made the electoral system fairer by eliminating many of the rotten boroughs and burgage tenements that were represented by two members while having very few voters, and by allocating more seats to districts in relatively newer factory towns and cities.

Since 1900, there have been several attempts at more reform. A 1910 Royal Commission on Electoral Systems recommended AV be adopted for the Commons. A very limited use of single transferable voting (STV) came in the Government of Ireland Act 1914. A Speaker's Conference on electoral reform in January 1917 unanimously recommended a mix of AV and STV for elections to the House of Commons. However, that July the Commons rejected STV by 32 votes in the committee stage of the Representation of the People Bill, and by 1 vote substituted alternative vote (AV). The House of Lords then voted for STV, but the Commons insisted on AV. In a compromise, AV was abandoned and the Boundary Commission were asked to prepare a limited plan of STV to apply to 100 seats. This plan was then rejected by the Commons, although STV was introduced for the university constituencies and used until 1948 in some cases.

On 8 April 1921, a private member's bill to introduce STV was rejected 211 votes to 112 by the Commons. A Liberal attempt to introduce an Alternative Vote Bill in March 1923 was defeated by 208 votes to 178. On 2 May 1924, another private member's bill for STV was defeated 240 votes to 146 in the Commons.

In January 1931, the minority Labour government, then supported by the Liberals, introduced a Representation of the People Bill that included switching to AV. The bill passed its second reading in the Commons by 295 votes to 230 on 3 February 1931 and the clause introducing AV was passed at committee stage by 277 to 251. (The Speaker had refused to allow discussion of STV.) The bill's second reading in the Lords followed in June, with an amendment replacing AV with STV in 100 constituencies being abandoned as outside the scope of the bill. An amendment was passed by 80 votes to 29 limiting AV to constituencies in boroughs with populations over 200,000. The bill received its third reading in the Lords on 21 July, but the Labour government fell in August and the bill was lost.

Following the wartime coalition government, a landslide victory for the Labour Party in 1945 began a period of two-party dominance in British electoral politics, in which the Conservatives and Labour exchanged power with almost total dominance over seats won and votes cast (See British General Elections since 1945). There existed no incentive for these parties to embrace a pluralist voting system in such a political settlement, and so neither supported it, and electoral reform ceased to be a political issue for several decades.

==== Late 20th century ====
With the rise of the SDP-Liberal Alliance following 1981's Limehouse Declaration, Britain gained a popular third-party bloc that supported significant reform of the voting and parliamentary systems. Several polls throughout the early 1980s placed the Alliance in front of Labour and the Conservatives, and nearly all had them within contention. The continuing Liberal Party had until then received minimal support at elections and little influence on government, with the brief exception of the Lib–Lab pact in the late 1970s, but in which their influence was limited. Despite receiving roughly a quarter of the popular vote in both the 1983 and 1987 elections, however, few SDP-Liberal candidates were elected owing to FPTP requiring a plurality in each constituency and their vote being spread far more evenly geographically than the main parties. Therefore, the Conservatives, who benefited from overrepresentation of their vote and underrepresentation of the Alliance vote, won large majorities in the House of Commons during this period and reform remained off the agenda.

Elections to the European Parliament in mainland Britain used FPTP from their start in 1979 but were switched to a closed party list before the 1999 elections through the European Parliamentary Elections Act 1999 because the European Parliament mandated the use of proportional representation (more specifically either a party list or single transferable vote) in their elections.

==== 21st century ====
When Labour regained power in 1997, they had committed in their manifesto to a slew of new reformist policies relating to modernisation and democratisation of various institutions through electoral reform. For general elections, they had committed to implementing the findings of the Jenkins Commission, which was set up to evaluate flaws in FPTP and propose a new electoral system that would suit the quirks of British politics. The commission reported back, including a proposal for AV+, but its findings were not embraced by the government and were never put before the House of Commons; therefore, FPTP remained in place for subsequent elections. They introduced a number of new assemblies, in London, Wales and Scotland, and opted for additional-member systems of PR in all of these. They also adopted the supplementary vote system for directly elected mayors. While not specifically committing to elections by name, they had promised to abolish all hereditary peers in the House of Lords and establish a system by which representation in the Lords "more accurately reflected the proportion of votes cast at the previous election". Having faced continual pressure against any reform from the Lords themselves, Prime Minister Tony Blair was forced to water-down his proposals and agree to a settlement with the Conservative leader in the Lords in which 92 hereditary peers would remain, along with faith-based peers, and all others would be life peers appointed by either the prime minister directly, or on the recommendation of an independent panel. In Scotland, a Labour / Liberal Democrat coalition in the new Scottish Parliament later introduced STV for local elections. However, such reforms encountered problems. When 7 percent of votes (over 140,000) were discounted or spoilt in the 2007 Scottish Parliamentary and local council elections, Scottish first minister Alex Salmond protested that "the decision to conduct an STV election at the same time as a first-past-the-post ballot for the Scottish Parliament was deeply mistaken".

In the 2010 general election campaign, the possibility of a hung parliament and the earlier expenses scandal pushed electoral reform up the agenda, something long supported by the Liberal Democrats. There were protests in favour of electoral reform organised by Take Back Parliament. The Conservative-Liberal Democrat coalition government held a referendum on introducing AV for the Commons on 5 May 2011, which, despite commitments to review the voting system for "fair vote reforms" in the Conservative manifesto, and an unequivocal backing of AV from the Labour Party in their manifesto, was met by campaigning for No, and indifference with no clear or consistent party position, respectively. It was comprehensively defeated. The result of the referendum has had long-lasting political repercussions, being cited by later Conservative governments as proof that public opinion was decidedly against any reform of the voting system. As the Conservatives continued to be in government in some form or another until 2024, electoral reform was never seriously close to implementation post-2011.

The coalition had also committed to reforming the House of Lords into a primarily elected body, and a bill proposing elections under PR determining the majority of membership was put before the House in 2012. The bill was pulled before passage however, as while the government imposed a three-line whip on its MPs to support the measure, a large rebellion among Conservatives was developing. Matters were not helped by the Labour Party promising to vote against the measures, despite having promised to support similar such measures in the manifesto in 2010. To avoid a painful and humiliating defeat, Deputy Prime Minister Nick Clegg, who had instigated the bill's passage and whose Liberal Democrat party had long-since supported the reform, was forced to back down. Clegg accused the Conservatives of breaking the coalition agreement, and Prime Minister David Cameron was said to be furious at his backbenchers for endangering the government's stability and authority. (See main article: House of Lords Reform Bill 2012)

The 2015 general election was expected to deliver a hung parliament. However, the Conservative Party won a narrow majority, winning 51 percent of the seats on 37 percent of the national vote, but the Green Party, UKIP and the Liberal Democrats were under-represented and the Scottish National Party over-represented in the results compared to a proportional system. As a result, both during the campaign and after, there were various calls for electoral reform. Nigel Farage, leader of UKIP, declared support for AV+. Gus O'Donnell, the Cabinet Secretary from 2005 to 2011, argued that FPTP is not fit for purpose given the move towards multi-party politics seen in the country. Journalist Jeremy Paxman also supported a move away from FPTP.

In 2016, it was reported that in a conversation with a Labour peer in 1997, the Queen had expressed her opposition to changing the voting system to proportional representation.

In 2021 home secretary Priti Patel proposed replacing the supplementary vote method used in some elections in England and Wales with FPTP. The posts affected were the Mayor of London, elected mayors in nine combined authorities in England, and police and crime commissioners in England and Wales. In the Queen's Speech of May that year, the Government proposed the introduction of compulsory Photo ID for voters in England and in UK-wide elections. These measures were implemented with the Elections Act 2022.

A number of groups in the United Kingdom are campaigning for electoral reform, including the Electoral Reform Society (ERS), Make Votes Matter, Make Votes Count Coalition, Fairshare, and the Labour Campaign for Electoral Reform. In the lead up to, and especially since, the 2019 general election, various anti-Brexit pressure groups and online political influencers have moved to a position supporting and calling for widespread tactical voting to bring about more favourable election results under FPTP to those parties that support reform, most notably Best for Britain. In its most comprehensive form, such proposals include a national roll-out of the Unite to Remain pact in 2019, in which the Liberal Democrats, Greens, and Plaid Cymru stood down in some constituencies and endorsed each other for election, but on a much wider scale and including the Labour Party, with the expressed aim of building a rainbow coalition that could enact PR in a new parliament. Their campaign for soft-left cooperation is ongoing and has primarily focused on social media initiatives and sponsoring research into voting patterns. While the idea of a progressive alliance has seen significant discourse in left-leaning spaces, particularly on Twitter, it is thought unlikely to ever happen. The Labour Party does not support electoral reform and has a clause in their constitution (section 5, clause IV) requiring them to stand candidates in every parliamentary seat bar Northern Ireland. Senior figures in Labour, the Liberal Democrats, and Greens have, with varying degrees of explicitness, all dismissed the idea. There is also concern that such a proposal would not function as intended if implemented, as none of the 92 constituencies Unite to Remain operated in were successful, and some believe both that voters would react negatively to what could be perceived as "backroom deals" and "stitch-ups", or that association with the other parties would harm each one's reputation with target voters.

In Wales, the Senedd Cymru (Members and Elections) Act 2024 changed the electoral system for the Senedd from additional member using the D'Hondt method to proportional representation using closed lists.

The UK Labour government elected in July 2024 has a manifesto commitment to restrict donations to political parties and reduce the minimum voting age from 18 to 16. In December 2024, Liberal Democrat MP Sarah Olney introduced the Elections (Proportional Representation) Bill to the Commons under the ten minute rule, where it passed its first reading. The bill fell before its second reading at the prorogation of the 2024–2026 parliamentary session.

=== United States ===
Electoral reform is a continuing process in the United States, motivated by concerns of both electoral fraud and disfranchisement. There are ongoing extensive debates of the fairness and effects of the Electoral College, existing voting systems, and campaign financing laws, as well as the proposals for reform. There are also initiatives to end gerrymandering, a process by which state legislatures alter the borders of representative districts to increase the chances of their candidates winning their seats (cracking), and concentrating opponents in specific districts to eliminate their influence in other districts (packing).

=== Ukraine ===
Ukraine reformed in 2020 from parallel voting to Proportional representation.
