= Proportional representation in the United Kingdom =

Ongoing debate on electoral reform

2024 UK general election results using proportional representation, showing a hypothetical Labour–Liberal Democrat–Green government coalition. (Northern Ireland parties are depicted in black and the Speaker's seat, which is conventionally uncontested, in between.) Projection by the Electoral Reform Society.

Proportional representation in the United Kingdom has been a political debate on electoral reform in British politics for many years. The Northern Ireland Assembly, the Scottish Parliament, and the Senedd use forms of proportional representation (PR) in their devolved assemblies. The United Kingdom used PR nationally for EU Parliament elections before its exit. Support for proportional representation in the House of Commons has been strongest with smaller parties and, at times, with factions of the Labour Party. The Conservative Party has historically been less likely to support PR.

== History ==
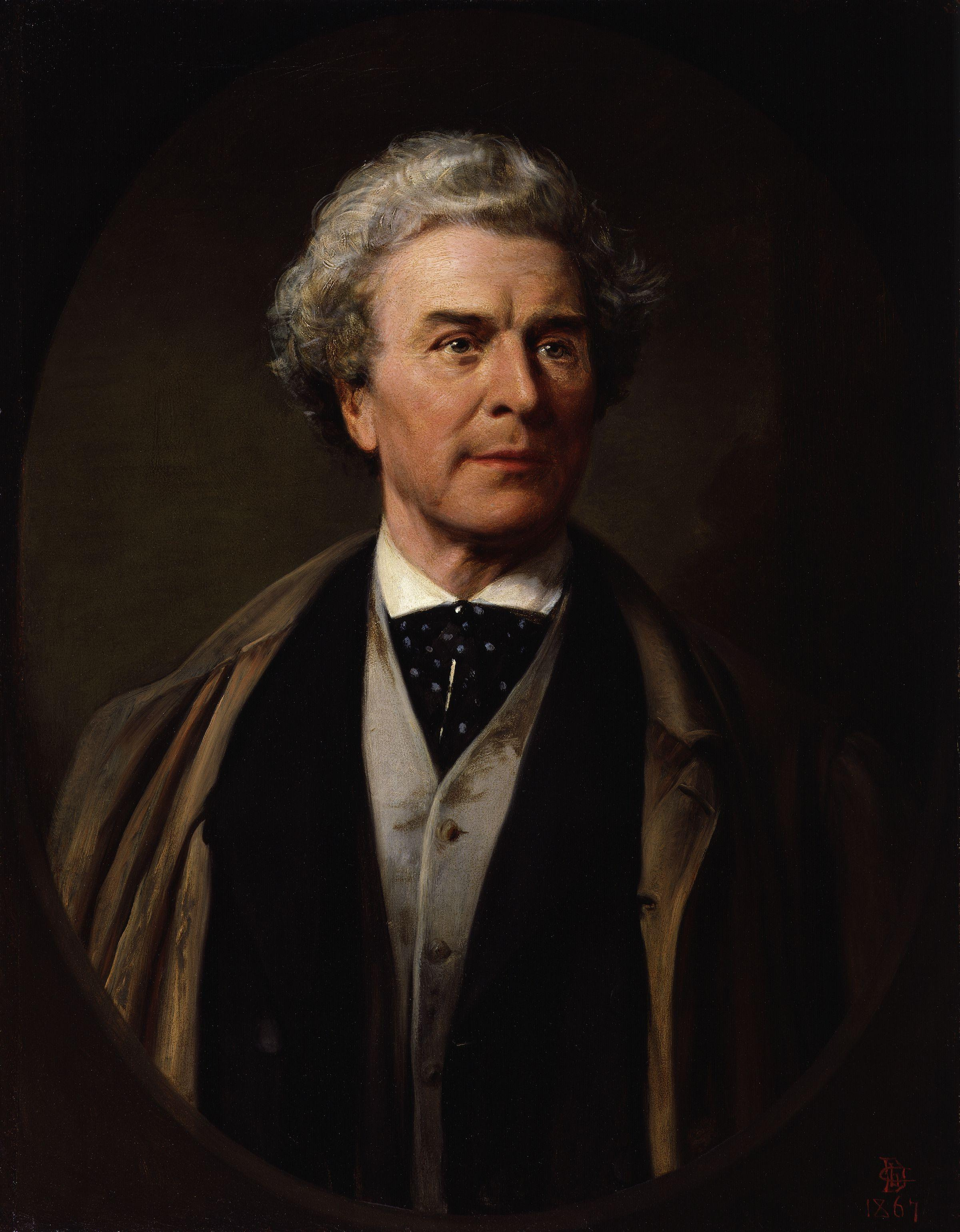
Thomas Hare, inventor of STV, was from England

Some British political parties, campaign groups and campaigners have long argued that the current first-past-the-post voting system used for parliamentary elections should be replaced with a proportional representation (PR) electoral system. British lawyer Thomas Hare invented single transferable voting, a candidate-based proportional representation election system in the 1850s. British philosopher John Stuart Mill endorsed PR in his book Considerations on Representative Government.

1919 Sligo election results (using STV)

From 1918 to 1929, Scottish school boards (educational authorities of counties and large cities) were elected using STV. STV was used from 1918 to 1950 to elect university MPs, representing the university constituencies of Cambridge, Oxford, Combined English Universities, Combined Scottish Universities and Dublin University (up to 1922). Five of these constituencies (Combined English Universities, Combined Scottish Universities, Dublin University, Oxford University, and Cambridge University) were multi-member seats, electing two or three MPs; the other two had a single seat each. The Representation of the People Act 1918 stipulated that university elections were to use STV. STV was used for the 1919 Sligo municipal election. STV was also used for Northern Ireland elections circa 1920.

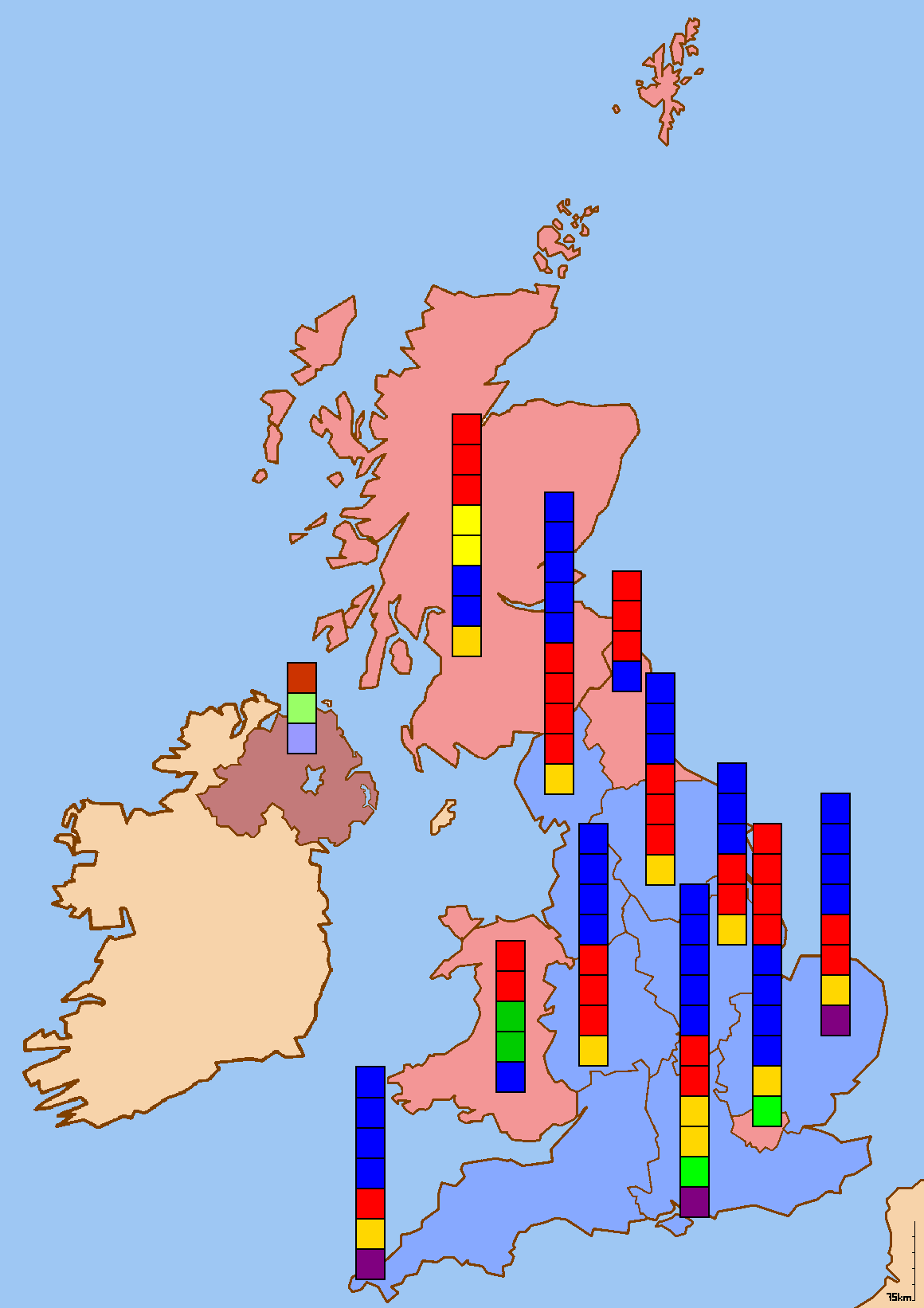
Results of the 1999 EU parliament election in the UK, which used closed-list PR

The first nationwide election using proportional representation was the 1999 European Parliament election in the United Kingdom, when 12 districts were used with district magnitude ranging from 3 to 10. Following the 2010 general election, the advocacy group Take Back Parliament was founded and protested the disproportional result. Similar results happened in 2015.

Following the 2024 general election, the Electoral Reform Society published a report to show how the election results would look like under a system of proportional representation. Labour remained the largest party but much reduced to 228 seats while the Conservatives increased slightly to 139 seats and Reform UK significantly to 100. The Green Party of England and Wales also increased significantly to 71 seats while the Liberal Democrats remained largely unchanged.

== Polling ==
A 2015 poll found that 57% of the public agree with the principle that "the number of seats a party gets should broadly reflect its proportion of the total votes cast" – compared to only 9% who disagree. The poll, which was scientifically weighted, also found that 51% of the population said they were "unhappy with the current electoral system and want it to change" compared to only 28% who want to keep first-past-the-post (FPTP).

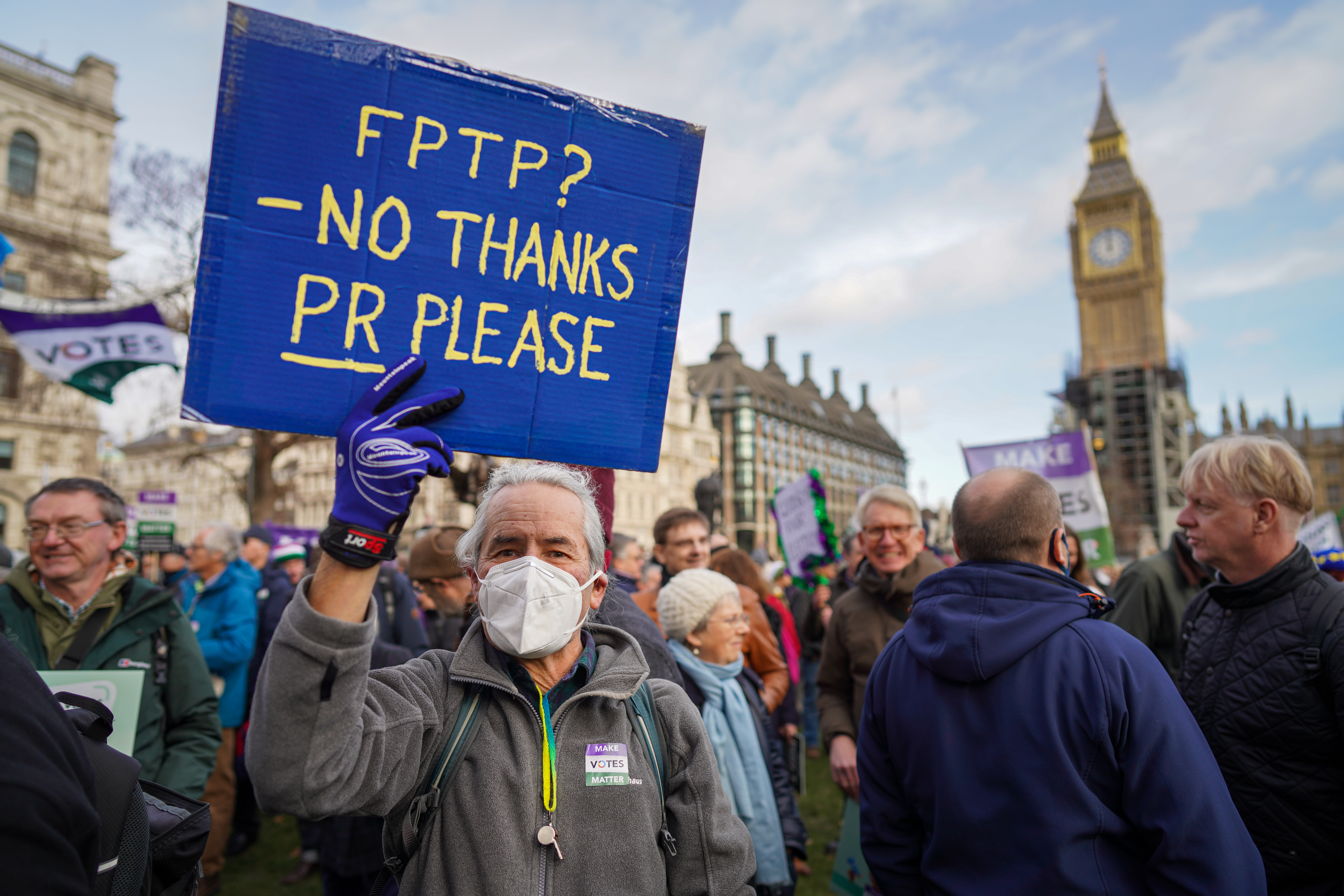
PR activists protest for electoral reform in response to the Elections Act 2022

A Redfield and Wilton poll conducted in July 2020 showed 54% of respondents supported switching to a Proportional Representation system, with 16% opposed. Results from a YouGov poll of 1,799 adults in Great Britain, conducted on 29 August 2022, placed those supporting proportional representation at 46%, don't know at 28%, and those supporting first-past-the-post at 26%.

In February 2025, a YouGov poll found support for proportional representation at 49%, don't know at 25%, and those supporting first-past-the-post at 26%. The majority of Reform UK, Liberal Democrats, Green Party and Labour voters supported proportional representation, while Conservative voters were divided.

== Parliamentary and party positions ==
The introduction of proportional representation has been advocated for some time by the Liberal Democrats and the Green Party of England and Wales, and by some pressure groups, such as Charter 88, Unlock Democracy and the Electoral Reform Society, first formed in 1884. In 1998 and 2003, independent commissions were formed to look into electoral reform.

Seats won in the 2005 election (outer ring) against number of votes (inner ring)

Following the 2005 election, in which Labour was elected with the lowest share of the national vote for any single party majority government in British history up to that time (that record was beaten in 2024), more public attention was drawn to the issue. The national newspaper The Independent started a petition for the introduction of a more proportional system immediately after the election, under the title "Campaign For Democracy". Make Votes Matter also advocate for proportional representation.

Labour pledged in its manifesto for the 1997 general election to set up a commission on alternatives to the first-past-the-post system for general elections and to hold a referendum on whether to change the system. The Independent Commission on the Voting System, headed by Roy Jenkins and known as the Jenkins Commission, was established in December 1997. In 1998, the commission published its report and recommended the AV+ system, which is a mix of the alternative vote and party-list proportional representation systems.

The Independent Commission on Proportional Representation (ICPR) was formed to review PR systems that had been recently introduced in the UK. Their report in 2003 found that PR would increase the number of parties and make coalitions more likely, but it did not conclude whether this was a beneficial outcome. The ICPR's report was generally seen as a way to fulfill Labour's promise to review PR systems in its 2001 manifesto.

Following the 2005 election, Lord Chancellor Lord Falconer said there was "no groundswell" for change, although a Cabinet committee was given the task of investigating reform.

In January 2008 the government produced a "desk-bound" review of the experience to date of new voting systems in the United Kingdom since Labour came to power in 1997. This review was non-committal as to the need for further reform, especially as regards reform of the voting system used in parliamentary elections.

In the 2005–2010 parliament, the Conservative Party was predominantly in favour of retaining FPTP. Electoral reform, towards a proportional model, was desired by the Liberal Democrats and the Green Party.

Following the UK 2010 general election, the new coalition government agreed to hold a referendum on voting reform. The Alternative Vote referendum took place on 5 May 2011; voters were given the choice of switching to the alternative vote (also known as instant-runoff) system or retaining the current one. The result was a vote against AV (a non-proportional system), with 32% in favour and 68% against. The Conservative government response to a 2016–17 parliamentary petition demanding proportional representation said that "A referendum on changing the voting system was held in 2011 and the public voted overwhelmingly in favour of keeping the FPTP system." Tim Ivorson of the electoral reform campaign group Make Votes Matter responded by quoting the petition's text that "The UK has never had a say on PR".

In 2015, the non-profit venture Make Votes Matter was formed to campaign for proportional representation. It made the point that some 68 per cent of votes were ineffective, and hence 'wasted' in the UK general election of 2015.

Following its inaugural meeting on 29 November 2016 and until September 2017, the All-Party Parliamentary Group on Electoral Reform was a cross-party group consisting of 150 MPs who support electoral reform, chaired by Richard Burden and latterly Chuka Umunna.

In 2019 the Liberal Democrats, Green Party of England and Wales, Scottish National Party, and the Brexit Party (which has since changed its name to Reform UK) all "signed a declaration calling for the first-past-the-post method for Westminster elections to be replaced by a proportional system".

In 2020, Keir Starmer supported electoral reform during his bid to become leader of the Labour Party but since dropped the pledge. At the 2022 Labour Party conference, delegates voted in favour of the party including a commitment to proportional representation in its next manifesto, although such a policy was not included. Eight out of the party's eleven affiliated trade unions support electoral reform.

In 2026, 64 Labour MPs backed an amendment to the Representation of the People Bill, which called for a new national commission to examine the current system for general elections and recommend reforms.

Zack Polanski, leader of the Green Party, stated in 2026 that his goal for the party was to win enough seats for the Greens to be a kingmaker following the next United Kingdom general election. He believed that outcome would pressure movement on proportional representation.

Andy Burnham, a long-time supporter of proportional representation, won the 2026 Makerfield by-election and subsequently became PM. He has, however, rejected the idea of introducing proportional representation in the current parliament, saying that he would require electoral reform "to be in a manifesto and endorsed at a general election".

== Devolved parliaments ==
Results of the 2022 Northern Ireland Assembly election, which used STV

The Northern Ireland Assembly has used single transferable vote (STV) since its first election in 1998.

The Scottish Parliament has used the additional-member system (AMS) for every election since 1999, with the most recent being in 2026. Local council elections are now held under STV.

The 2026 Senedd election was held under closed-list proportional representation for the first time. The reforms to the voting system increased the size of the Senedd, adopted a party-list voting system and reduced the number of constituencies to sixteen. The changed abolished single-member districts and ended the use of AMS for the Senedd.

== See also ==
- Elections in the United Kingdom
- Electoral reform in the United Kingdom
- People Demand Democracy
- Proportional representation#Advantages and disadvantages
- Proportional representation in Canada
- Senedd Reform Act
