= Proportional Representation Society =

Proportional Representation Society may refer to:

- Electoral Reform Society
- Proportional Representation Society of Australia
- Proportional Representation Society of Ireland
