= Labour Campaign for Electoral Reform =

British political organisation

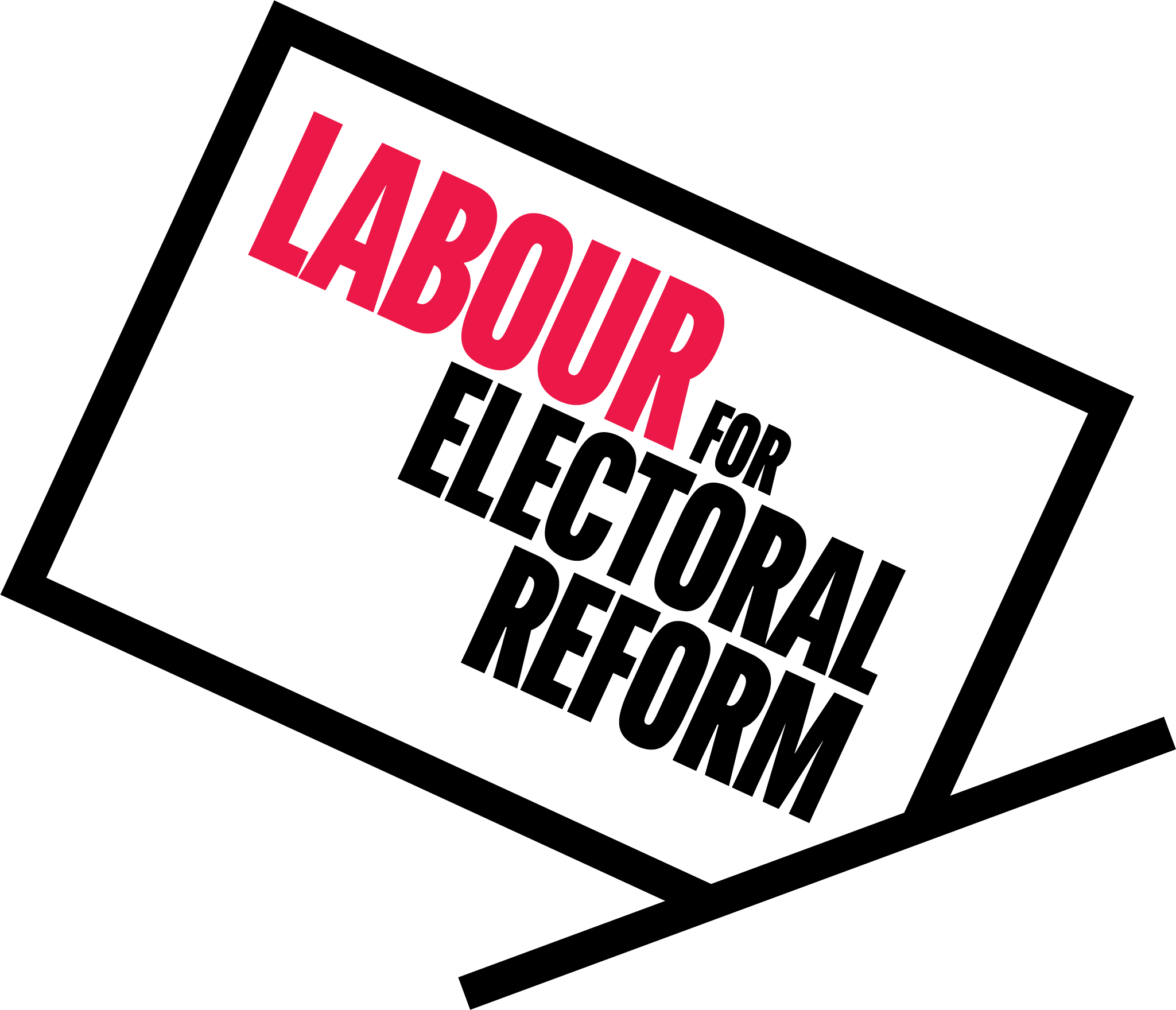
- Abbreviation: LCER
- Chair: Sandy Martin
- Website: Official website
- Formerly called: Labour Study Group for Electoral Reform

The Labour Campaign for Electoral Reform (LCER) is an organisation formed of members and supporters of the British Labour Party, who are interested in issues of democratic renewal and electoral reform.

LCER campaigns on a range of constitutional issues associated with accountability, democracy and governance; its flagship campaign is for proportional representation in the House of Commons, which it argues is a precondition for other democratic reforms to be effective.

LCER characterises the first-past-the-post voting system (FPTP) as "unfair and deeply flawed, leading to voter apathy, disaffection with politics, and parliaments which don't represent the people". It campaigns for FPTP to be replaced with an electoral system which is "broadly proportional, and in which all votes matter".

The organisation works closely with other organisations promoting electoral reform in the UK, including Make Votes Matter, the Electoral Reform Society and Politics for the Many. LCER is distinct from these other organisations in that it focuses its efforts on promoting proportional representation within the Labour Party. This is driven by the belief that a change to the UK's voting system can only come about via Labour:

"We believe that the impetus for changing the voting system must come from the Labour Party. The Conservatives will never support PR, because First Past the Post gives them such a big electoral advantage. The smaller parties already support PR, but lack the influence to bring about change. Only Labour can drive the change."

Since 2022, LCER has hosted the Labour for a New Democracy (L4ND) campaign.

== History ==
LCER originated in the 1970s as the Labour Study Group for Electoral Reform. After Labour lost power to the Conservatives in the 1979 general election, the group changed its name to the Labour Campaign for Electoral Reform. Early supporters included academic Ron Medlow; Robin Cook, Jeff Rooker and Martin Linton, who went on to be Labour MPs; and activist Mary Southcott, who would later become LCER's parliamentary and political officer.

Throughout the 1980s and 1990s, during which Labour spent most of its time in opposition, support for LCER increased steadily among both Labour members and elected representatives, with motions on electoral reform being tabled at the party conference almost every year. In 1990, the party conference voted narrowly to commission an inquiry into electoral systems; LCER is widely credited in bringing this about. The inquiry, led by Professor Raymond Plant, recommended the introduction of the supplementary vote. Labour included in its 1997 election manifesto a pledge to hold a referendum on electoral reform; however, this pledge was never honoured, despite the work of the Jenkins Commission, in which Liberal Democrat (and former Labour MP) Lord Jenkins explored possible voting systems on behalf of incumbent Labour Prime Minister Tony Blair's government.

In 2010, incoming Conservative Prime Minister David Cameron announced a referendum on electoral reform in return for the support of the Liberal Democrats in a governing coalition. The referendum, which offered instant-runoff voting (branded as "Alternative Vote", or AV) as an alternative to FPTP, was held in May 2011. AV is not a proportional voting system, and as such many electoral reformers considered it no great improvement on FPTP: Liberal Democrat leader and Deputy Prime Minister Nick Clegg called it a "miserable little compromise", and some leading proponents of electoral reform considered AV to be such a poor system that they voted for the status quo. LCER did support AV in the 2011 referendum, via the Yes2AV umbrella group, but following the heavy and widely predicted defeat of the "Yes" campaign, LCER's activities fell into abeyance for several years, with activists exhausted and the organisation having spent almost all its money.

Activity has increased steadily since 2015, with many Constituency Labour Parties passing resolutions in favour of PR, and increasing interest from trade unions. In September 2020, LCER joined with a number of other groups and Labour MPs to launch Labour for a New Democracy, a campaign to "build support for UK electoral reform in Labour with the aim of changing party policy by the time its next conference takes place". At the time, polling revealed that three-quarters of Labour members believed the party should commit to supporting proportional representation and adopt it as a policy.

The COVID pandemic meant that the Labour Party conference of 2020 was held online. By the 2021 conference, around half of all CLPs had passed resolutions in favour of PR, and over 150 CLPs submitted conference motions calling for Labour to back PR. 80% of CLP delegates voted in favour of the composite motion, but it was defeated owing to an overwhelming vote against by the affiliated trade unions, most of which at the time did not have policy on electoral reform. By October 2021, the trade union Unite had changed its policy to back proportional representation.

In June 2022, the trade union Unison also voted to support proportional representation. Other unions that have declared their support for proportional representation include the Associated Society of Locomotive Engineers and Firemen (ASLEF), the Musicians' Union (MU) and the Transport Salaried Staffs' Association (TSSA). Politicians from all wings of the Labour Party have come out in support of proportional representation, including the former leader of Welsh Labour and former First Minister, Mark Drakeford.

At the Labour Party Conference in September 2022, delegates from CLPs and trade unions voted overwhelmingly in favour of adopting proportional representation. The motion was not binding on the party leadership, but did commit the party to including PR in its election manifesto.

Labour leader Keir Starmer commented on the issue during his leadership campaign: "I also think on electoral reform, we've got to address the fact that millions of people vote in safe seats and they feel their vote doesn't count. That's got to be addressed." However, it was subsequently reported that Starmer has a "long-standing view against proportional representation".

== Supporters ==
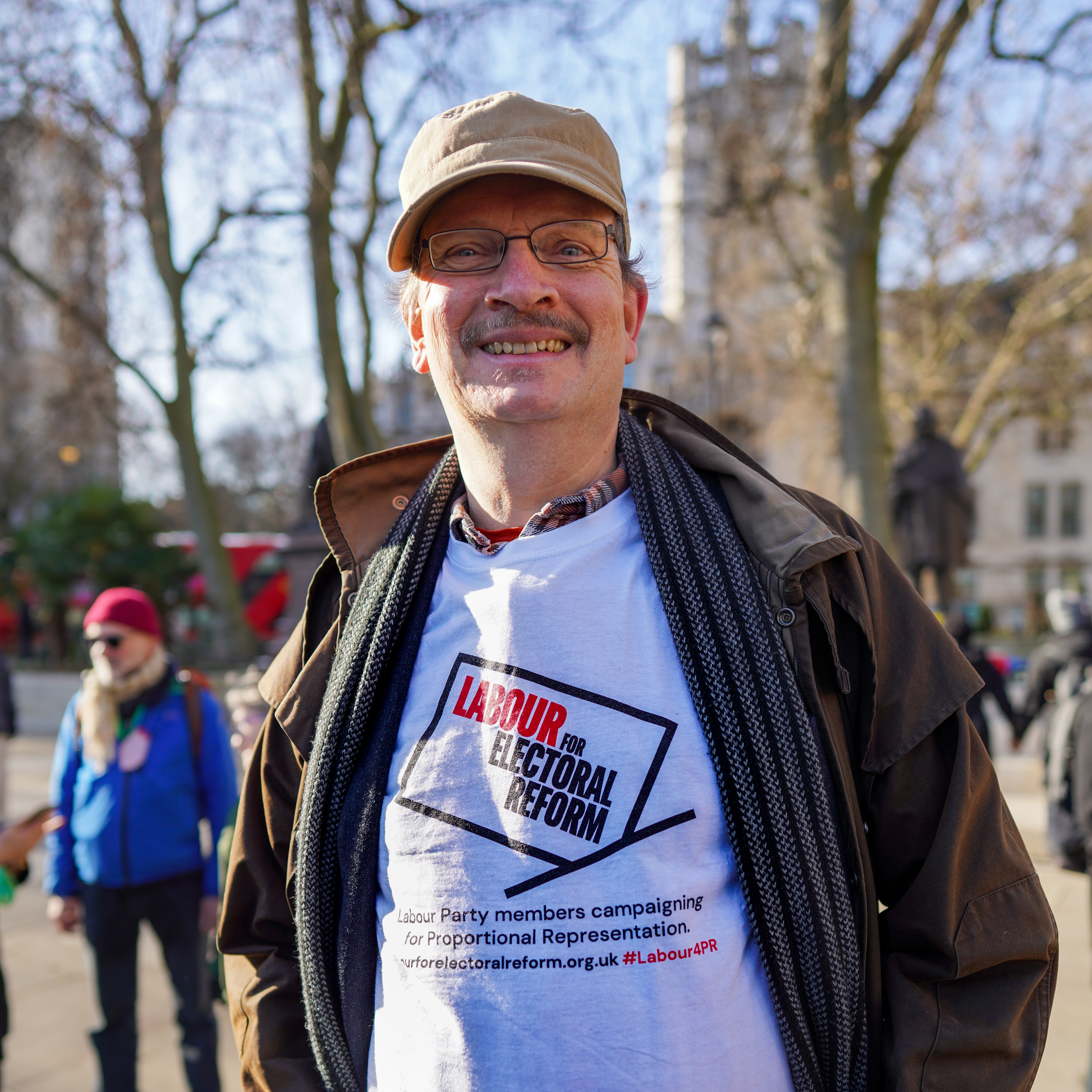
Sandy Martin wearing a Labour Campaign for Electoral Reform t-shirt at a demonstration for electoral reform in February 2022

Many Labour MPs past and present have supported LCER and its activities. In the past, this included such high-profile figures as Mo Mowlam, Robin Cook, Paul Flynn, Clare Short, Tessa Jowell, Rhodri Morgan, Stephen Twigg, Oona King and Janet Anderson.

LCER has prominent supporters from both the left and the right wings of the Labour party. It is currently chaired by former MP Sandy Martin, with former MEP Julie Ward and councillor Duncan Enright as vice-chairs. Former CEO of the Electoral Reform Society Ken Ritchie is the group's treasurer, whilst trade unionist Billy Hayes and former MP Willie Bain are also on the executive committee.

In 2017, Cat Smith co-wrote the foreword to a report jointly written by LCER with Make Votes Matter. Other current supporters include MPs David Lammy, Jonathan Reynolds, Tulip Siddiq, Stephen Kinnock, Alan Whitehead and John McDonnell. Outside the Commons, support comes from Baroness Lister of the House of Lords, and the elected mayor of Greater Manchester, Andy Burnham.

== Position ==
LCER does not advocate the introduction of a specific system of proportional representation, believing that the selection of a new voting system should be the work of a Royal commission. Rather, it campaigns for the Labour Party:

- To reject first-past-the-post voting for elections at all levels of government
- To ensure that the Constitutional Convention already promised in Labour's manifesto, includes in its remit a consideration of voting systems
- To include in its election manifesto a commitment to establishing a broadly proportional voting system at all levels of government

LCER bases its support for proportional representation on the belief that PR systems are more democratic than FPTP, but also on evidence that PR voting systems are associated with societies with higher levels of social and economic equality; with higher levels of public spending and redistribution; and with a lower propensity to engage in violent conflict.
