= Proportional Representation Society of Ireland =

Electoral reform organisation in Ireland

The Proportional Representation Society of Ireland was the principal electoral reform organisation in Ireland until the establishment of the Irish Free State in 1922. It was closely associated with the Irish Home Rule movement.

== History ==
The Proportional Representation Society of Ireland was founded on 20 April 1911 in Dublin. Its establishment came about following a visit to Ireland by Leonard Courtney, 1st Baron Courtney of Penwith, who advocated proportional representation as an answer to the political problems faced in Ireland at the time. The society was initially a branch of its sister organisation in Great Britain, the Proportional Representation Society. The society's foundation was welcomed by several notable Irish politicians, including Arthur Griffith, who saw proportional representation as a way of ensuring that both the Unionist and Nationalist communities were fairly represented in Ireland once it had Home Rule. The electoral system endorsed by the society was the single transferable vote (STV), combined with the quota counting method and multi-member constituencies.

The society's president was the moderate unionist Thomas Spring Rice, 2nd Baron Monteagle of Brandon. He helped to encourage support for the STV system among southern unionists as Home Rule began to look more likely, while Griffith used his considerable influence to ensure Sinn Féin adopted STV as official policy. Largely as a result of the work done by the Proportional Representation Society of Ireland, the system was embodied in the Third Home Rule Bill (1912), subsequently the ill-fated Government of Ireland Act 1914. The Society maintained its activity and proportional representation was first introduced in 1918 for a local election to the Sligo Corporation the following year.

Proportional representation was introduced to the whole of Ireland in all elections, parliamentary and municipal, in the following two years, starting with the 1920 Irish local elections. Proportional representation was enshrined in the Constitution of the Irish Free State.

The success of the society resulted in its disestablishment in the 1920s. The two attempts of Fianna Fáil to alter the voting system (1959 and 1968) were campaigned against by the British Electoral Reform Society, led by Enid Lakeman. The single transferable vote electoral system continues to be used in both Northern Ireland and the Republic of Ireland.
