= Eric Syddique =

British activist (1936–2020)

Eric Mahmood Syddique (1936 - January 2020) was chief executive of the UK Electoral Reform Society in the 1990s.

From 2001 to 2013 he was secretary of Electoral Reform International Services, which provides assistance in conducting elections worldwide. He has written extensively for Voting matters and Representation.

Syddique was a member of the Royal Institute of International Affairs, Chatham House, and vice chairman of the UK's H S Chapman Society. He was also a member of the Council of the Hansard Society.

In 1986 Syddique was Chairman of the Lewisham and Kent Islamic Centre.

He wrote the entry for Enid Lakeman (one of his predecessors as ERS chief executive, who died in 1995) in the 2004 Oxford Dictionary of National Biography.

In 1971 he was elected a member of the Liberal Party Council.

From 1973 to 1995 Eric Syddique was a Liberal Democrat member of Sevenoaks District Council in Kent.

Eric Syddique died aged 84 in January 2020 at home in Eynsford, where he had lived for 60 years.
