= Proportional representation in Canada =

Proportional multi-winner electoral system in Canada

Proportional representation in Canada refers to the ongoing debate over whether and how to adopt proportional representation (PR), usually mixed-member proportional or single transferable vote, to provincial and/or federal elections in Canada. Cities in Manitoba and Alberta elected representatives to their legislatures in various cities using proportional representation between the 1920s and 1950s. Federal adoption of PR has been historically supported by the New Democratic Party and the Liberal Party with varying levels of support over time. In the 2010s, there was a brief all-party support for PR following the 2015 Canadian federal election.

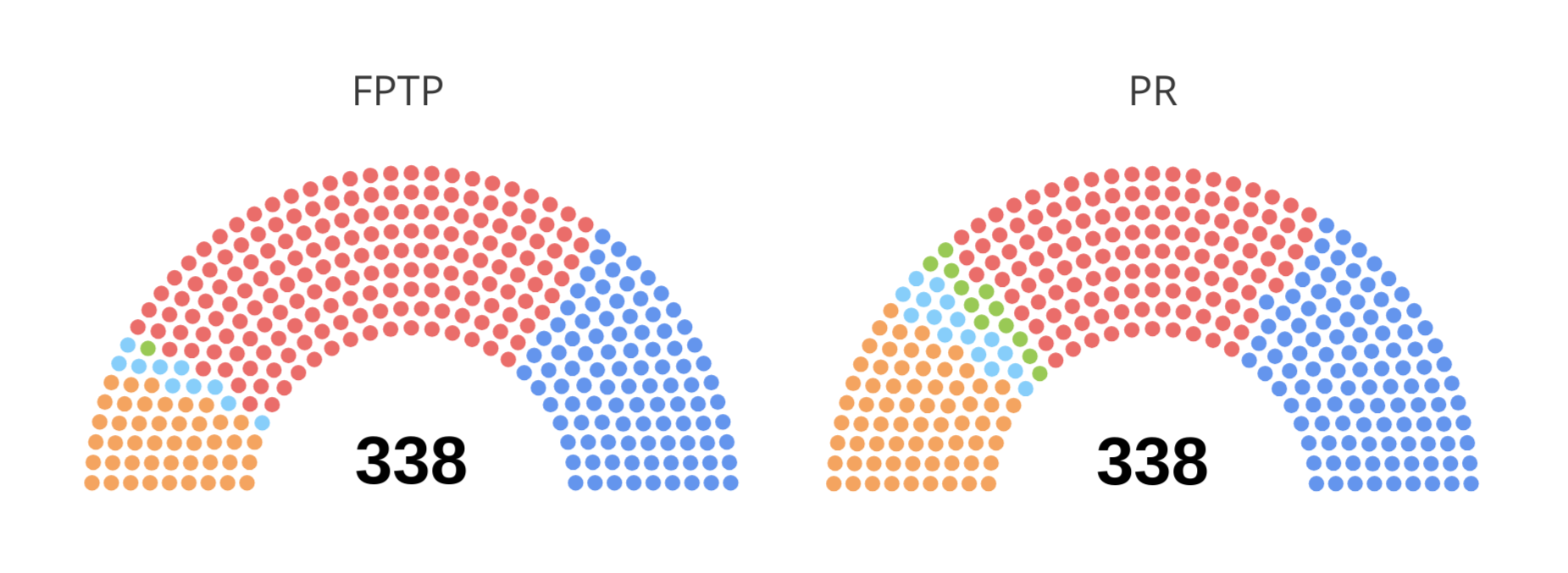
On the left is the actual results of the 2015 Canadian federal election. On the right is the seat distribution if the election used party-list proportional representation.

== Background ==
Members of the House of Commons of Canada (lower house) are currently elected by first-past-the-post (the candidate with the most votes wins) in single-member districts called "ridings." The prime minister of Canada is chosen by the parliament, typically by a party with a majority of seats.

In the past at various times, thirteen ridings elected two MPs through plurality block voting. That Halifax would have two seats was written right into the BNA Act, Canada's constitution.

Several different election systems have been used at the provincial level including single transferable voting (a form of proportional representation), instant-runoff voting, block voting, and a post/seat system where each seat in a district is elected through a separate contest either through FPTP or IRV.

== History ==
The Proportional Representation League was founded in 1893 as an international (United States and Canada) association of PR advocates. The group put out a quarterly PR Review in the first decades of the 1900s.

In late 1915, the Canadian P.R. Society was formed.

=== 1910s and 1920s ===
The first city in Canada to use proportional representation was Calgary in 1917, to elect nine city councillors. It used STV for city elections until 1960, a little in the 1960s, then fully again in 1971.

Nelson and several other municipalities in BC adopted STV between 1917 and 1919.

Winnipeg used STV in its city elections from 1920 to 1970, as did several of its suburb municipalities.

Victoria and Vancouver used STV for city elections in the early 1920s.

Edmonton used STV 1923 to 1927.

Lethbridge had adopted instant runoff voting in 1913 and switched to STV in 1928.

Saskatoon, Regina, North Battleford and Moose Jaw used STV in the 1920s. Saskatoon used STV again 1939-1941.

=== 1920s–1930s attempt at electoral reform at federal level ===
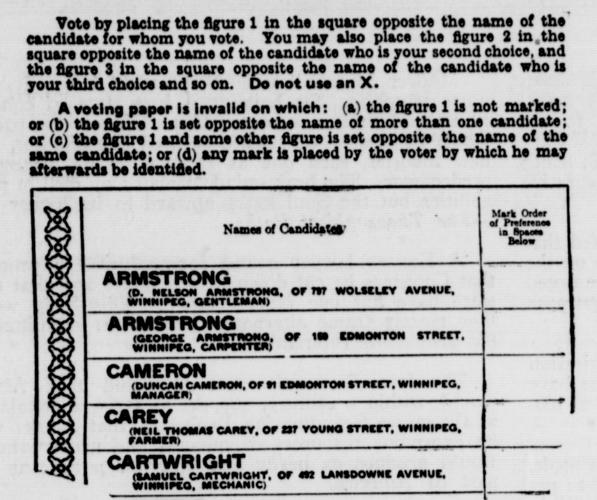
Sample ballot for the first PR election using STV for Parliament in Winnipeg in 1920

Following the 1919 Winnipeg general strike, a royal commission "appointed to inquire into the reasons for industrial unrest" suggested proportional representation as a way to appease laborers. The 1920 Manitoba general election was the first election in Manitoba to use proportional representation (single transferable vote) in Winnipeg. Following its use in Winnipeg, in 1924 Alberta law was amended to allow Edmonton and Calgary to use PR to elect their MLAs.

In May 1921, the House of Commons 1921 Special Committee on Proportional Representation and the Subject of the Single Transferable or Preferential Vote was formed. The report found that single-member ridings only served the "intended function" when two candidates competed for the seat. While the report did not explicitly propose single transferable vote (STV) for the upcoming election, it did recommend holding a referendum on STV and implementing the alternative vote (instant-runoff voting) in ridings with more than two candidates.

William Lyon Mackenzie King was a member of the Proportional Representation Society of Canada (P.R. Society). He later was elected on a platform that included PR in December 1921.

It is true that in the Liberal platform which was passed in August, 1919, a platform they do not like to be reminded of any oftener than cannot be avoided, the Liberal party committed itself to the principle of proportional representation.

— Arthur Meighen, Leader of the Opposition, 1923

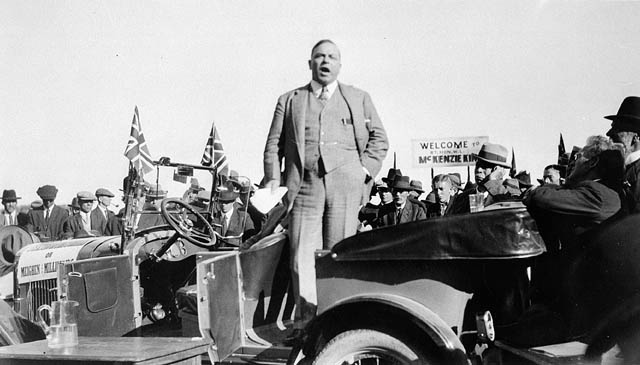
Three-time prime minister William Lyon Mackenzie King expressed support for PR on multiple occasions but never put it into place.

King again expressed support for proportional representation in 1933 ahead of the 1935 election:

I believe that the only true method of securing a representative parliament is by a system of proportional representation properly worked out with regard to the dominion as a whole. The reform should commence with the cities and the larger municipalities in our country.

— William Lyon Mackenzie King, Leader of the Opposition, 1933

Another committee (The Special Committee on Elections and Franchise Acts) was formed in 1935 to look at whether STV or the alternative vote (AV) would be "conducive to good government." The 2016 file characterized this 1936 report as "more reserved" than the 1921 report.

=== Decline in 1950s ===
By the 1950s, in Manitoba, worsening apportionment issues (cities had smaller share of representatives than their proportion of the population) were blamed on preferential voting and proportional representation (although simply adding more city members could have resolved the issue). Additionally, the mixed electoral system in the province was blamed for the perception that elected members were focusing disproportionately on rural issues. The mixed system of STV/IRV was dropped, and first past the post in single-member districts was adopted in 1954.

=== 1979–1991 reports ===
Three more government reports discussed proportional representation during the latter half of the 20th century.

- Task Force on Canadian Unity, also known as the Pépin-Robarts Commission (1979)
  - Recommended MMP
- Royal Commission on the Economic Union and Development Prospects for Canada, also known as the MacDonald Commission (1985)
  - Recommended PR in the Senate or PR in the House of Commons as a second choice
- Royal Commission on Electoral Reform and Party Financing, also known as the Lortie Commission (1991)
  - Recommended keeping FPTP
  - Was open to PR in the Senate

=== 2000s ===
Voters supported the use of STV in British Columbia by 15 points in 2005

During the 2000s, a series of provincial electoral reform ballot initiatives failed.

- 2005 British Columbia electoral reform referendum — failed to reach the 60% threshold
- 2005 Prince Edward Island electoral reform referendum
- 2007 Ontario electoral reform referendum
- 2009 British Columbia electoral reform referendum

=== 2010s-present ===
The disproportionality of Parliament in the 2011 Canadian federal election was 12.45 according to the Gallagher Index, mainly between the Conservatives and NDP on the one hand, and the Liberal, BQ and Green parties on the other.

In December 2014, the New Democratic Party (NDP) put forward a motion in the Commons to promise that the 2015 Canadian federal election "should be the last conducted under the current first-past-the-post electoral system" and the last "under any other winner-take-all electoral system." The party supported a move toward mixed-member proportional (MMP). Conservative party spokesman Jason MacDonald argued Canadians did not want electoral reform and that "the NDP should respect democratic will of Canadians."

In 2015, Justin Trudeau vowed to make the 2015 election the last election to use first past the post (FPTP) and "make every vote count." In the Liberal Party's 2015 manifesto, the Liberal Party stated, "Within 18 months of forming government, we will introduce legislation to enact electoral reform."

In the months after winning an outright majority in Parliament with less than 40% of the vote, the Liberals were accused of stalling on electoral reform. In 2016, the Canadian House of Commons Special Committee on Electoral Reform was formed to research and propose changes to Canada's electoral system. The file was released in December 2016. After Maryam Monsef, the Minister of Democratic Institutions, criticized the process and results of the file, she was replaced with Karina Gould, and the Liberal Party formally abandoned electoral reform efforts. Elections Canada had set a deadline in mid-2017 for changes ahead of the 2019 election.

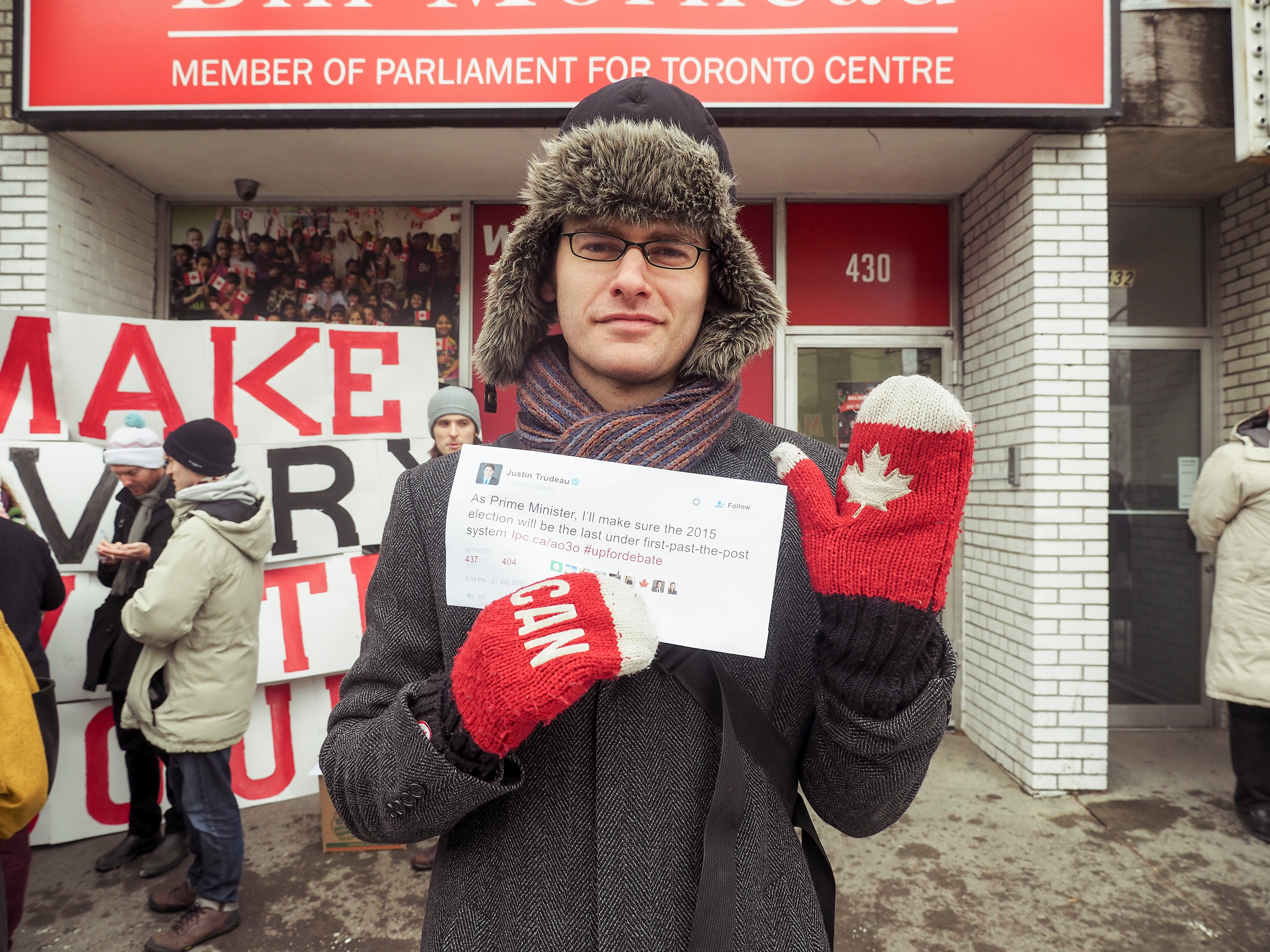
Leadnow activist urges Trudeau to uphold his campaign promise, 2016

Held during the national conversation over PR, Prince Edward Island voters ranked (using instant-runoff voting) MMP as their preferred electoral system for the Legislative Assembly of Prince Edward Island in a nonbinding referendum. The election's 36.46% turnout was criticized for being abnormally low.

A third referendum to change BC's electoral system occurred on December 7, 2018. The referendum was put forward by a confidence and supply arrangement from the NDP and Greens. The change was defeated by 22.6 percentage points.

A referendum in Prince Edward Island on whether to switch from FPTP to MMP was narrowly defeated by 3.48%, although the result is technically "nonbinding" as neither the Yes or No options received a majority of the vote in 60% or more of the province's electoral districts (the threshold).

== Support and opposition ==
=== Polling ===
A Business in Vancouver exit poll after 2025 Canadian federal election found 58% of voters supported PR for federal elections, 17% were opposed, and 25% were unsure.

A Research Co. poll in early 2026 found majority support for party-list proportional representation (55%) but not majority support for STV (48%) or MMP (46%). Support for party-list PR was significantly higher among Canadians aged 18–34 (65%) than 55+ Canadians (45%). The poll also found that two-thirds of voters were satisfied with FPTP.

=== Support ===
Fair Vote Canada advocates for proportional representation for the Parliament of Canada. The group lists multiple systems as options, including open-list PR, single transferable vote (proportional ranked-choice voting), MMP, and regional proportional representation.

The nationwide New Democratic Party supports proportional representation. NDP leadership in Ontario is in support of PR, particularly MMP.

The Liberal Party supported PR following the 2011 election when came third in seat share. The party has not supported PR since 2017.

=== Opposition ===
Most contemporary PR referendums have failed in Canada.

In late 2025, Premier David Eby (NDP) stated he had no interest in pursuing PR in British Columbia.

== Gallery ==
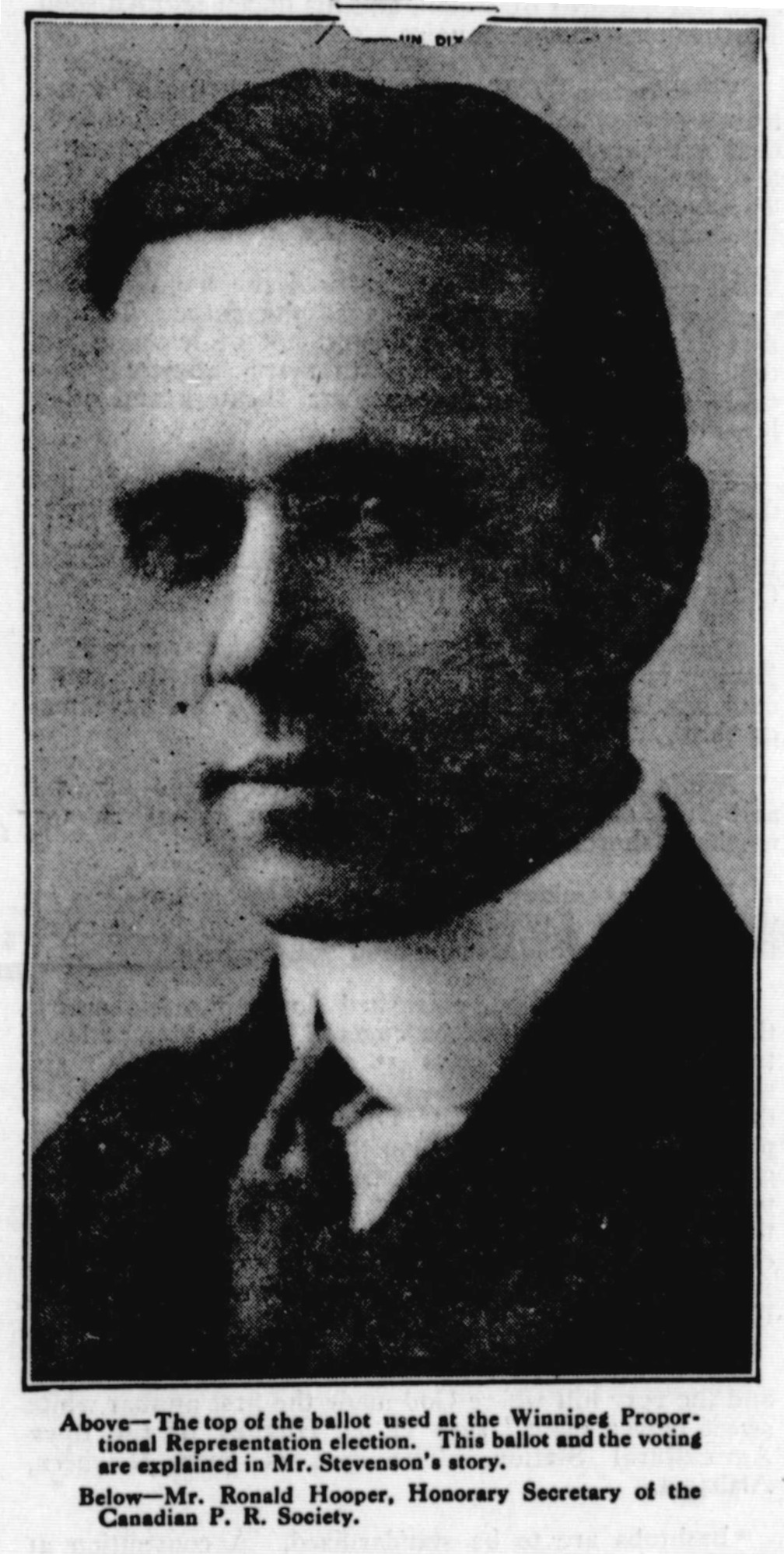
Ronald Hooper, honorary secretary of the Canadian P.R. Society, editor of The Proportional Review, later a Winnipeg newspaperman

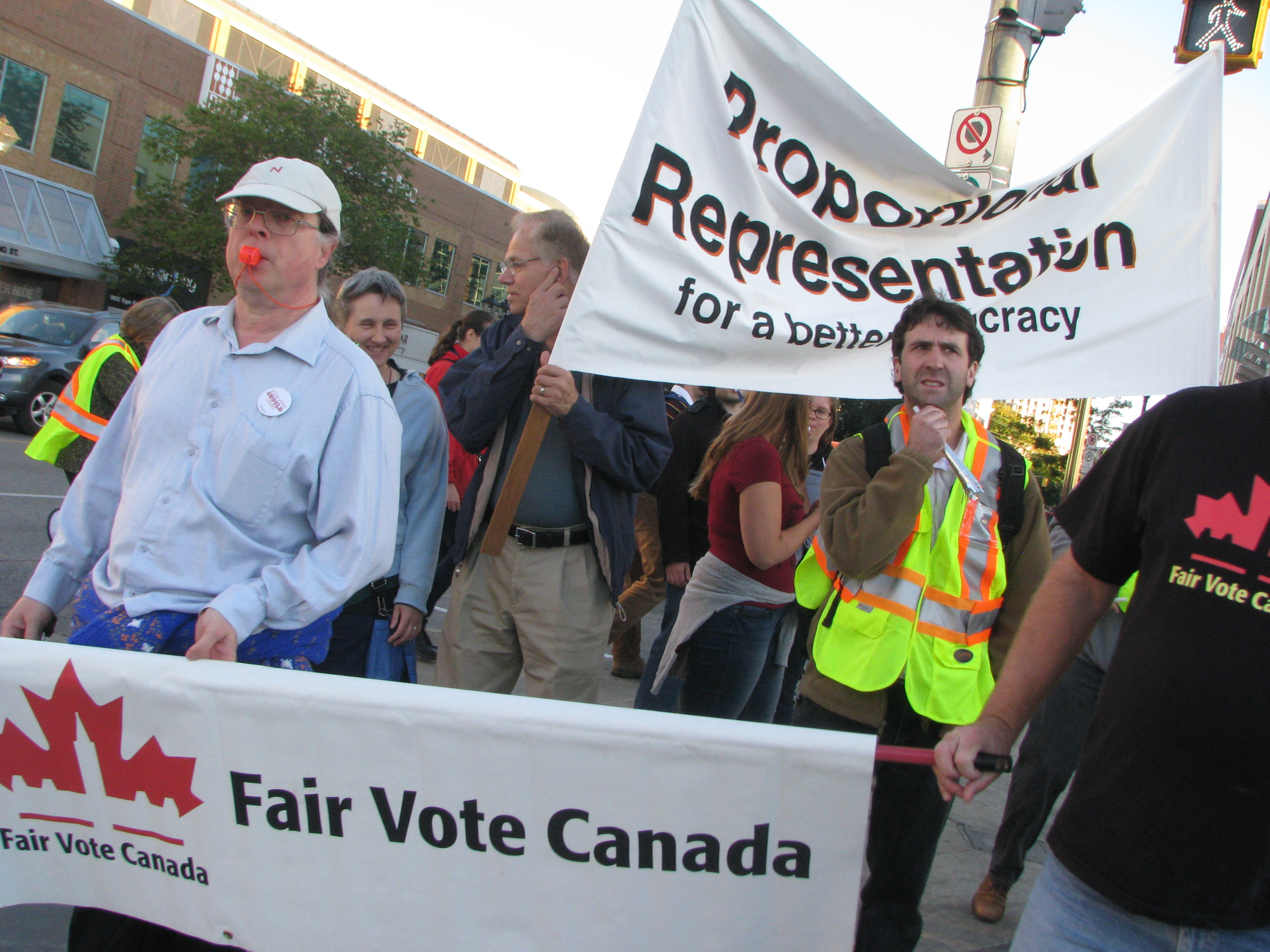
Fair Vote Canada members advocate for proportional representation in 2013

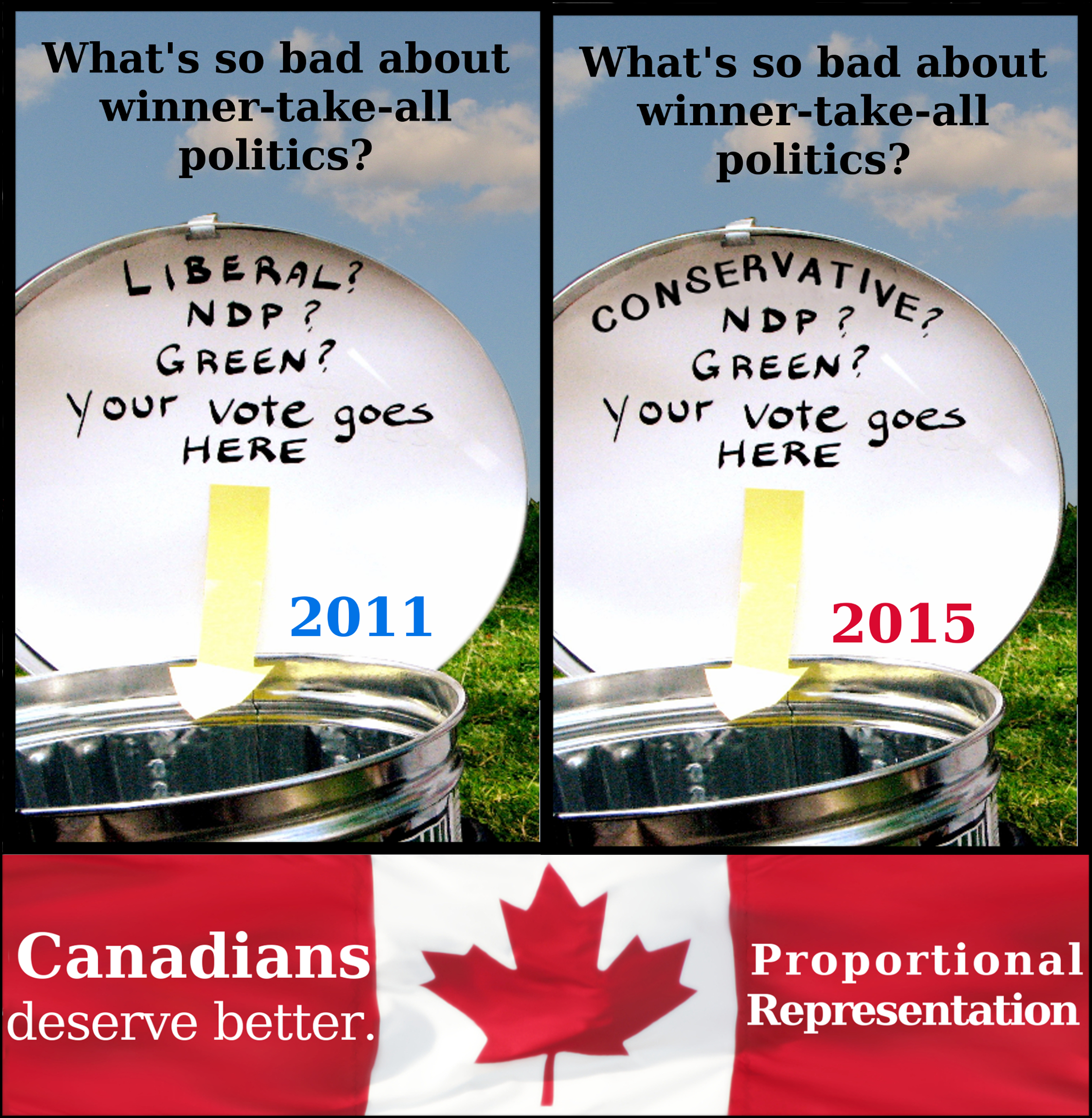
Social media post advocating for PR on Flickr

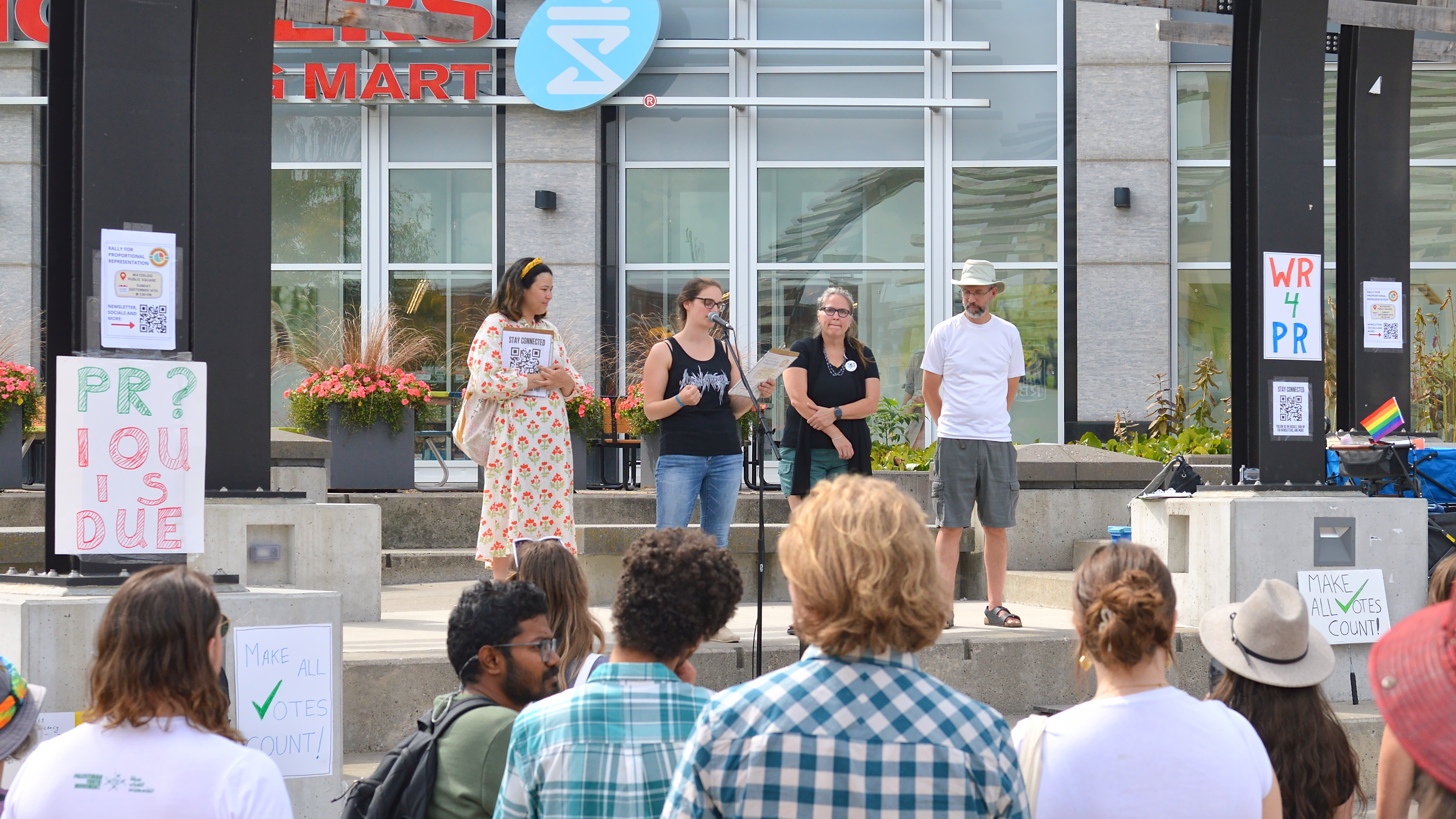
Rally for PR in Waterloo, Ontario in September 2025

== See also ==
- Electoral reform in Canada
- Canadian electoral system
- Proportional representation in the United Kingdom
- Proportional representation in the United States
