= YES! To Fairer Votes =

UK political campaign

- The YES! To Fairer Votes logo
- Type: Political
- Legal status: Campaign
- Purpose: To change United Kingdom's voting system
- Headquarters: London
- Region served: United Kingdom
- Official language: English
- Leader: Katie Ghose

YES! To Fairer Votes was a political campaign in the United Kingdom whose purpose was to persuade the public to vote in favour of the Alternative Vote (AV) in the referendum on Thursday, 5 May 2011. YES! To Fairer Votes was unsuccessful in changing the voting system, with 32.1% of votes cast in favour. It was opposed by the anti-reform campaign NOtoAV.

== Structure ==
YES! To Fairer Votes was a non-profit making organisation established as a company limited by guarantee called Yes In May 2011 Ltd. Its board was chaired by Katie Ghose (Chief Executive of the Electoral Reform Society). Other members were Pam Giddy (of the Joseph Rowntree Reform Trust), Neal Lawson (of Compass), Vicky Seddon (of Unlock Democracy) and John Sharkey (of the Liberal Democrats).

== Campaign funding ==
The Guardian's analysis also showed that the YES! To Fairer Votes campaign had outspent the anti-AV campaign by £3.4m to £2.6m, with most of the funding coming from the Joseph Rowntree Reform Trust and the Electoral Reform Society (ERS). George Osborne, the Conservative Chancellor of the Exchequer, accused the ERS of having a vested interest in a yes vote, as their commercial subsidiary Electoral Reform Services Ltd (ERSL) was printing the postal ballots for the referendum. The Press Complaints Commission later ruled against this. The Sun and Mail subsequently had to print retractions.

== Campaign criticism ==
A number of post mortems of the campaign were written, all highly critical of the way the campaign was run and of its major backers failure to deal with these issues.

The Electoral Reform Society's formal post mortem on the campaign led by Professor John Curtice of the University of Strathclyde identified that "The criticisms of AV put forward by the 'No' campaign were far more popular and proved more effective in shaping how people eventually voted on 5 May. The 'Yes' campaign's key arguments were either lost or did not resonate with people in terms of why they should vote 'yes'."

Andy May, a key member of the Yes Campaign, drew attention to a number of strategic blunders in the campaign and criticised the campaign director and senior staff. His view was corroborated by another insider account by former staff member James Graham. Anthony Barnett criticised one of the major funders, the Joseph Rowntree Reform Trust, for lack of oversight and scrutiny of its huge donation. Criticism of the Electoral Reform Society's role was also widespread and resulted in major changes to the organisation. In the council elections in 2011 there were 52 candidates for the 15 places available. Only four of the previous council were re-elected with eight of the new members having stood explicitly on a joint platform of reforming the society.

On 20 March 2021 the BBC broadcast a radio programme about the campaign, which was to roughly correspond with the approaching 10th anniversary of the referendum. Several senior figures from the campaign weighed in with previously unheard criticisms of the way the campaign was run, notably campaign chair Katie Ghose saying that "although there was a fair amount of swagger on the Yes side, actually no one knew what they were doing". Director of Operations and Finance Nick Tyrone told the story on the programme of how the campaign had considered placing inflatable MPs bottoms in town squares so that people could "kick them".

== Political parties supporting YES! To Fairer Votes ==
The following parties supported the change to AV:

- The Liberal Democrats
- Green Party of England and Wales and the Scottish Green Party
- The Christian Peoples Alliance
- The Scottish National Party (SNP)
- Plaid Cymru
- Sinn Féin
- The Social Democratic and Labour Party (SDLP)
- The Alliance Party
- The UK Independence Party (UKIP)

Although Labour Party leader Ed Miliband supported AV, the party did not campaign for a Yes vote in the referendum, and there were opposing Labour Yes and Labour NOtoAV campaigns.

Despite the Conservative Party's formal position against AV, party members aligned to Conservative Action for Electoral Reform, an internal party group in favour of electoral reform, did campaigning in favour.

== Other organisations supporting YES! To Fairer Votes ==
- 38 Degrees
- Compass
- Ekklesia
- Electoral Reform Society
- The Financial Times
- Friends of the Earth
- Greenpeace
- The Guardian
- The Independent
- Joseph Rowntree Reform Trust,
- The New Economics Foundation
- ResPublica
- Take Back Parliament
- Unlock Democracy
- World Development Movement

== Notable individuals supporting YES! To Fairer Votes ==
The following people actively supported the campaign:

- Chris Addison
- Kriss Akabusi
- Rt Rev David Atkinson
- Naomi Alderman
- Jonathan Bartley
- Martin Bell
- Honor Blackman
- Helena Bonham Carter
- Billy Bragg;
- Melvyn Bragg
- Rt Rev Colin Buchanan;
- John Cleese
- Steve Coogan
- Rt Rev Peter Dawes
- Greg Dyke
- Colin Firth
- Stephen Fry
- Bonnie Greer
- Eddie Izzard
- Rt Rev Michael Langrish
- Rt Rev Martyn Jarrett
- Joanna Lumley
- Kevin Maguire
- Art Malik
- Francesca Martinez
- John O'Farrell
- Rt Rev John Packer
- James Palumbo
- Rt Rev Michael Perham
- Tony Robinson
- David Schneider,
- Rt Rev Alan Smith
- Rt Rev Nigel Stock
- Polly Toynbee
- Rt Rev Alan Wilson
- Richard Wilson
- Benjamin Zephaniah

== See also ==
- NOtoAV, the opposing campaign group
