= Make Votes Matter =

British advocacy group for proportional representation

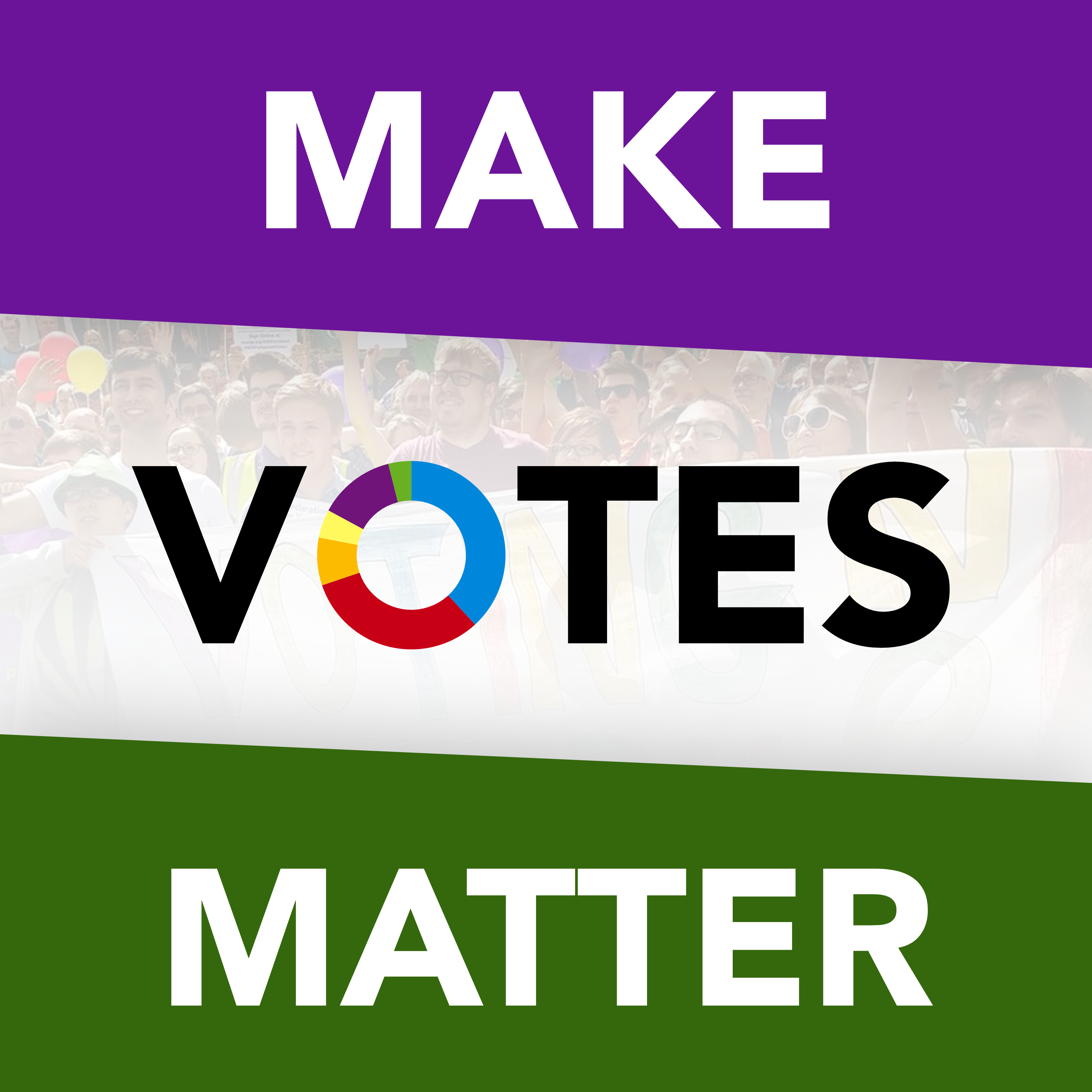
- Founded: 2015; 11 years ago London, United Kingdom
- Type: Non-governmental organisation
- Purpose: Democracy, electoral reform, elections, proportional representation
- Location: Bristol
- Region served: United Kingdom
- Method: Lobbying, grassroots campaigning, education
- Key people: Emma Harrison, Chief Executive; Owen Winter, Co-founder and Spokesperson; Tim Ivorson, Co-founder and Company Secretary
- Website: http://www.makevotesmatter.org.uk/

Make Votes Matter is a political pressure group based in the United Kingdom which campaigns for replacing the first-past-the-post voting system with one of proportional representation for elections to the British House of Commons.

== Overview ==
Make Votes Matter is "the cross-party campaign to introduce Proportional Representation to the House of Commons, led by democratically-organised activists in a united movement for electoral reform." It was co-founded by Owen Winter, Klina Jordan and other activists. It advocates for the replacement of the first-past-the-post currently used for elections to the House of Commons. Make Votes Matter advocates a proportional representation (PR) system (in line with the rest of Europe), campaigning for it based on the principles established in the Make Votes Matter Declaration. These are that a voting system should ensure:

- That those who are entitled to vote have a vote that counts, and counts equally – no matter who they vote for, or where they live;
- That the share of seats a party gets should closely reflect the share of votes the people give them.

The pressure group favours replacing the current voting system in the UK (First Past the Post), with a system of proportional representation where each vote individually counts and correlates to seats in parliament.

== Activities ==
In the weeks following the 2015 general election a number of online petitions calling for electoral reform emerged, coordinated by individuals and organisations such as the Electoral Reform Society and Unlock Democracy. These petitions received over 477,000 signatures and were delivered to 10 Downing Street by a cross-party group of politicians. Through these petitions, a group of activists formed to continue campaigning for proportional representation.

In February 2016, Make Votes Matter organised a cross-party summit to discuss how to achieve a reformed voting system attended by politicians including Chuka Umunna and Natalie Bennett.

In May 2016, the organisation orchestrated an open letter to then Leader of the Labour Party, Jeremy Corbyn, signed by 7 MPs and over 10,000 members of the public, including 2,000 Labour members.

Most recently, the campaign has orchestrated national days of action for Proportional Representation such as Hungry for Democracy on 6 February 2018 in which 407 people joined a 24-hour "hunger strike". Those that took part in the day of action included public figures, MEPs, and MPs such as Stephen Kinnock. Later on in 2018, the campaign organised a nationwide day of action - Demand Democracy Day - on 30 June as a prelude to the inaugural Cabinet Office-organised National Democracy Week. The action day saw volunteers organise events in over 60 towns and cities across the UK from Truro to Aberdeen.

Make Votes Matter is supported by an alliance of organisations and individuals that have endorsed the 'Make Votes Matter Declaration'. This includes the Green Party of England and Wales, the Liberal Democrats, Plaid Cymru, the Scottish National Party and UKIP as well as ex-Shadow Chancellor John McDonnell, Michael Sheen, Frankie Boyle, the Electoral Reform Society and others.

== Labour for a New Democracy ==
In September 2020, Make Votes Matter joined with other pressure groups and Labour MPs to launch Labour for a New Democracy, a campaign to "build support for UK electoral reform in Labour with the aim of changing party policy by the time its next conference takes place".

According to polling by YouGov in December 2019 three-quarters of Labour members believe the party should commit to supporting proportional representation and adopt it as a policy. A YouGov poll in April 2021 suggested 62% of Labour Party voters support proportional representation. A later poll by YouGov in September 2021 suggested this number had risen to 66% of Labour Party voters supporting proportional representation. A poll in July 2021 of almost 1,000 Labour Party members resulted in 83% saying they believed the party should back proportional representation. As of 4 June 2022, 334 constituency Labour parties (CLPs) had passed policy in favour of proportional representation. This works out as a majority of the 648 total CLPs, of which it passed the majority mark in December 2021.

A motion to support proportional representation was rejected at the September 2021 Labour Party conference. Over 150 constituency Labour parties (CLPs) voted to send motions on proportional representation to conference and it was the second most popular issue for the conference. 79.51% of constituency Labour Party delegates backed the motion, while 95.03% of affiliates – almost entirely comprising unions – voted against. This led to an overall result of 42.24% in favour of the motion and 57.76% opposed. Labour for a New Democracy responded saying "Our task now is to bring on board the leadership and wider Labour movement."

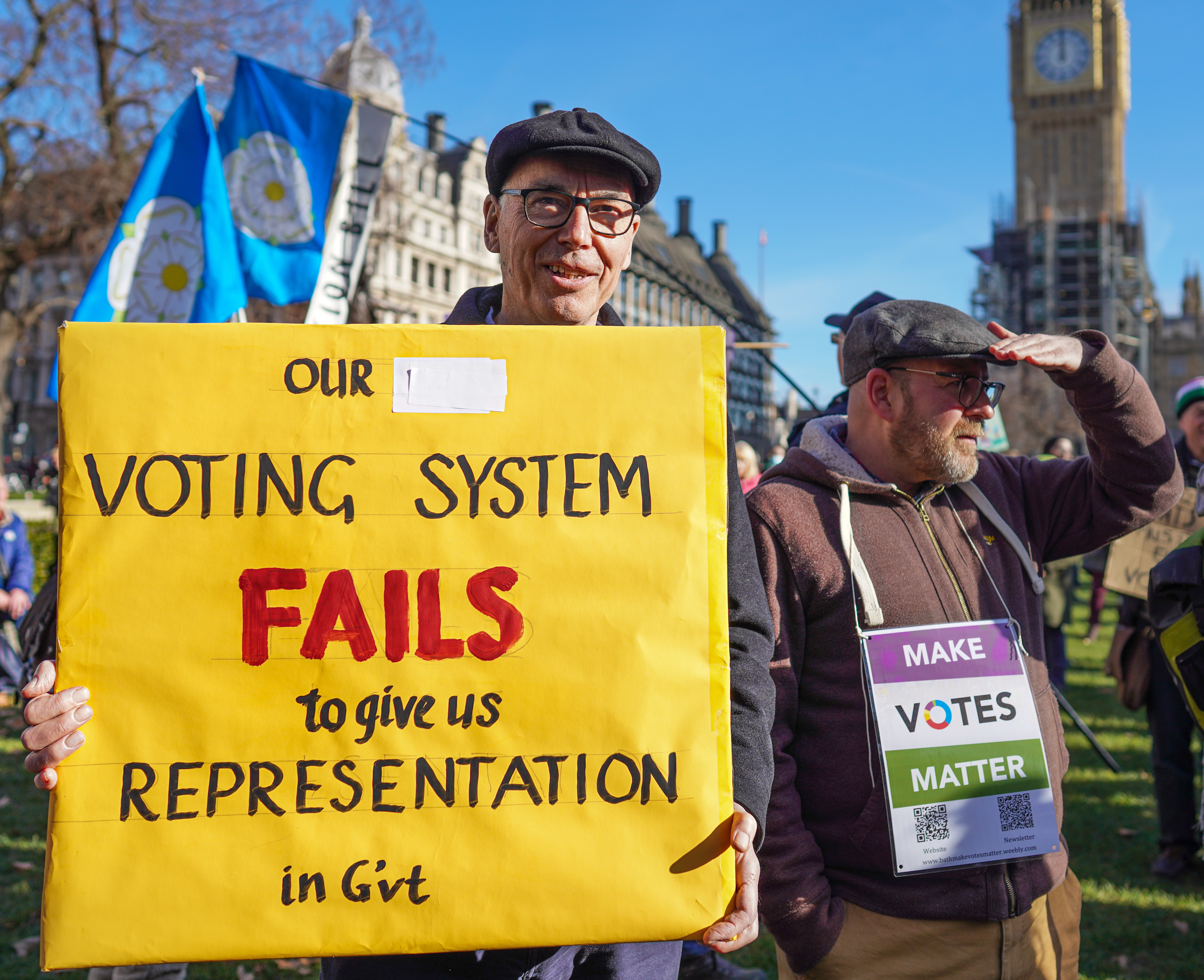
Make Votes Matter protest for PR

On 21 September 2022, it was announced that 370 CLPs were in support of proportional representation, equating to approximately 60% of all CLPs in the UK. On 26 September 2022, Labour Party members and trade unions voted in favour of ending the first-past-the-post electoral system and replacing it with a proportional electoral system at the Labour Party's annual conference in Liverpool. However, the motion is not binding. The motion was submitted to the Labour Party conference by approximately 140 local Labour Party groups. Since the party's previous conference in 2021, more trade unions including the two largest in Unite and Unison have voted among themselves to embrace support for proportional representation. However, Labour Party leader Keir Starmer has said that electoral reform is not a priority and ruled out putting electoral reform in the Labour Party's next election manifesto. The decision by Keir Starmer has received criticism from multiple figures within the party, including Mayor of Greater Manchester, Andy Burnham, former Shadow Chancellor of the Exchequer, John McDonnell, and Neal Lawson who chairs and helped set up the Labour affiliated think tank, Compass.

== See also ==
- Chartists
- Electoral reform in the United Kingdom
- Electoral Reform Society
- History of suffrage in the United Kingdom
- Labour Campaign for Electoral Reform
- Proportional representation in the United Kingdom
- Suffragettes
- Take Back Parliament
- Unlock Democracy
