= Enid Lakeman =

British activist (1903–1995)

Lakeman

Enid Lakeman, OBE (28 November 1903 – 7 January 1995) was a British political reformer, writer and politician, noted for her long-standing championship of the single transferable vote system of elections.

== Early life and education ==
She was born and brought up in Kent, and studied chemistry at Bedford College, University of London, graduating with first-class honours in 1926. She went on to work in the chemical industry in Britain and in Germany. During the Second World War she was a radar operator with the Women's Auxiliary Air Force (WAAF).

== Career ==
In 1946, Lakeman became Research Secretary at the Proportional Representation Society, which changed its name to the Electoral Reform Society in 1958. This was and still is a lobby group campaigning for the introduction of the single transferable vote (STV) in multi-member constituencies to replace the first-past-the-post electoral system used in most British elections. She was appointed Director of the Society in 1960. In this capacity she addressed innumerable meetings, edited pamphlets, drafted the Society's submissions to official inquiries, lobbied politicians, government departments and journalists, visited schools, and wrote hundreds of letters to newspaper editors.

In 1955, she wrote, with James Lambert, Voting in Democracies, a detailed comparative study of electoral systems in different countries. It went through several revisions and the latest, with Lakeman as sole author, was published in 1974 under the new title How Democracies Vote. This book continues to be a standard reference work on electoral systems.

The Irish government in 1958 and again in 1968 tried in a referendum to abolish the use of STV in the Republic of Ireland and to revert to first-past-the-post. On both occasions, Lakeman led the Electoral Reform Society's successful campaign to retain the STV system. She was also instrumental in securing the adoption of STV in Northern Ireland in 1972.

In her politics, Lakeman was a lifelong activist in the Liberal Party (now Liberal Democrats). She stood for Parliament unsuccessfully in 1945, 1950, 1955 and 1959. In the 1960s, she was an elected member of her local borough council in Kent. She was a humanist, a vegetarian, a feminist and an internationalist.

== Honors and awards ==
She was appointed an Officer of the Order of the British Empire (OBE) in the 1980 Birthday Honours, and received the George Hallett Award from the American Association of Political Science in 1993.

== Later life and death ==
She retired as Director of the ERS in 1980 but continued as the Society's honorary editorial consultant. As her obituarist in The Times noted, "she produced an endless stream of articles and books ... and could still correct a proof more accurately than people a third of her age".

She died in Kent at the age of 91.

== Selected works ==
- Enid Lakeman, How Democracies Vote: A study of electoral systems, London, 1974. ISBN 0-571-04842-0
- Enid Lakeman, Power to Elect: The case for proportional representation, London, 1982. ISBN 0-434-40220-6
- Enid Lakeman, Twelve Democracies: Electoral systems in the European Community, London, 1991. ISBN 0-903278-12-X

== Sources ==
- Eric Syddique, "Lakeman, Enid (1903-1995)", Oxford Dictionary of National Biography, Oxford University Press, 2004.
- "Lakeman, Enid (1903-1995)", Who Was Who, London, January 2007.
- "Enid Lakeman" (obituary), The Times, London, 23 January 1995.
- "Enid Lakeman, OBE" (obituary), Irish Times, Dublin, 25 January 1995.
- Martin Wainwright, "Woman for votes: Enid Lakeman" (obituary), The Guardian, London, 17 January 1995.
- Michael Meadowcroft, "Enid Lakeman" (obituary), The Independent, London, 12 January 1995.
