= Take Back Parliament =

British advocacy group

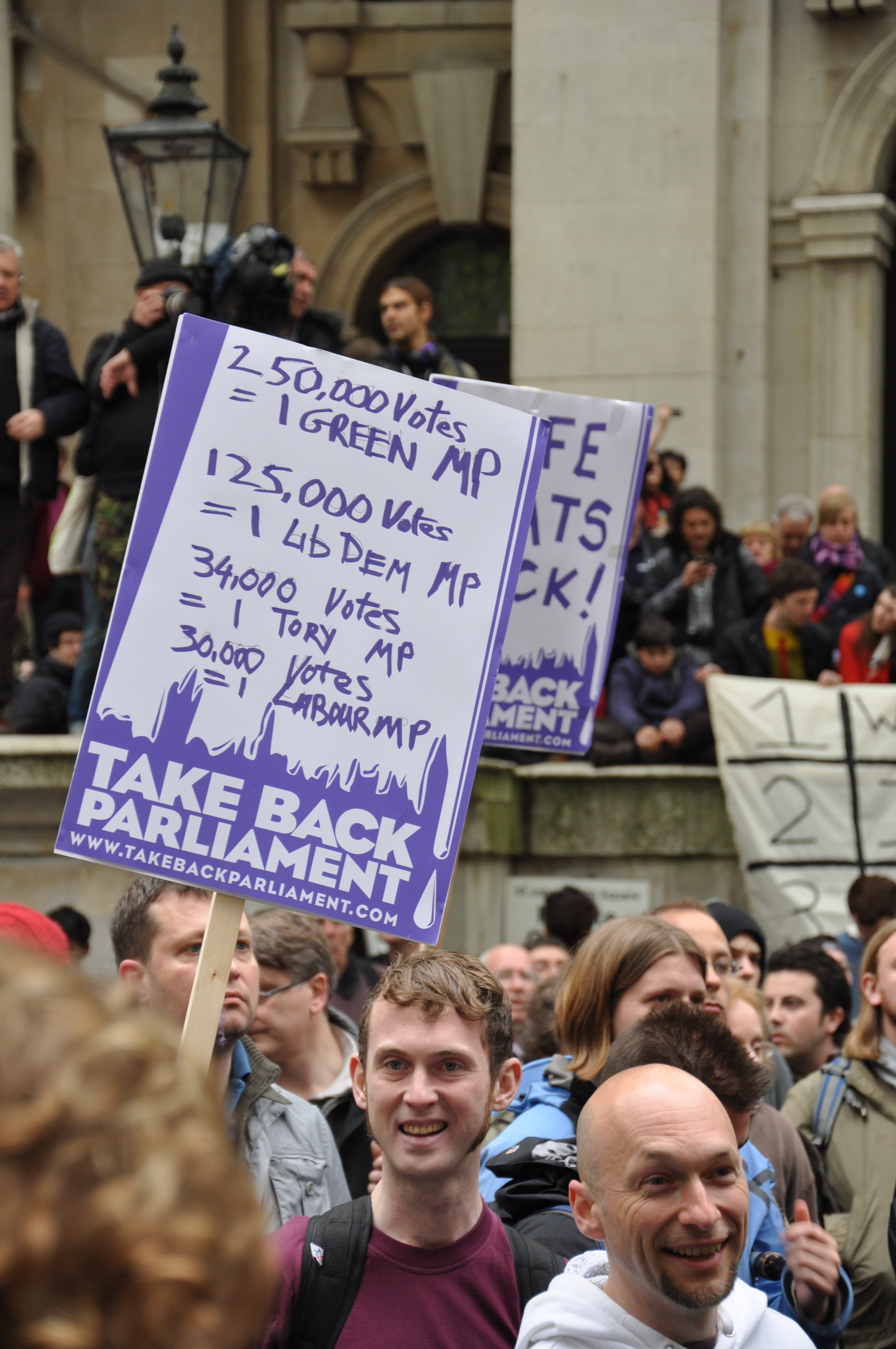
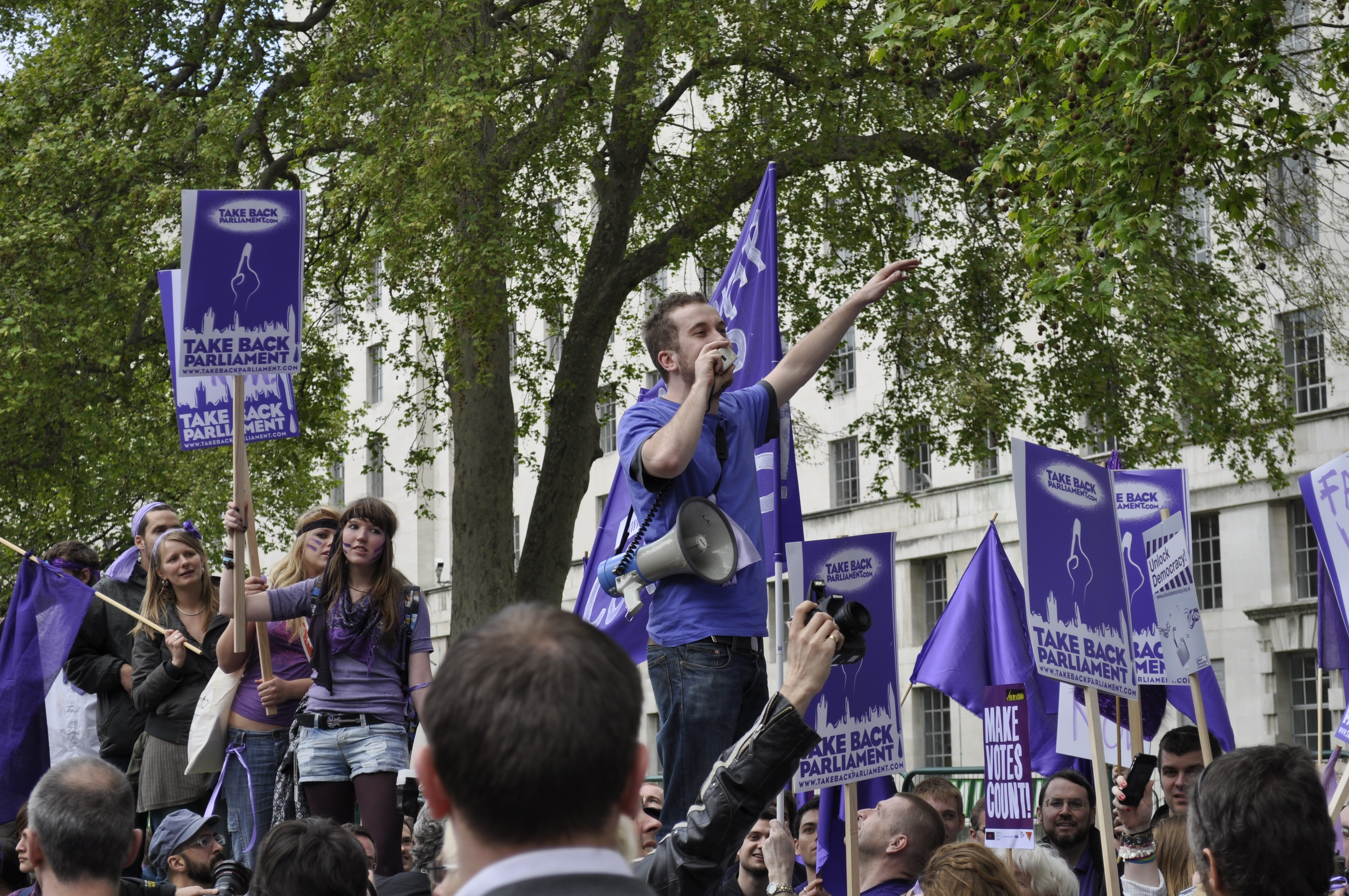
Take Back Parliament demonstrations in 2010

Take Back Parliament (TBP) was an organisation campaigning for democratic reform in the United Kingdom. The group was formed immediately before the 2010 general election, with funding from the Joseph Rowntree Reform Trust, hoping that there would be opportunities to push for electoral reform after the election. It took a leading role in the 2011 referendum on the Alternative Vote, pushing AV as better than the existing first past the post electoral system and potentially a step towards a proportional representation system. The group no longer exists.

== Formation ==
Take Back Parliament was formed immediately prior to the 2010 general election, with funding from the Joseph Rowntree Reform Trust [JRRT]. It was run as the last project of Power 2010, a campaign group which grew out of the Power Inquiry report on British democracy.

It was launched in expectation that a hung parliament would open up political space for movement on electoral reform in the UK. Andrew Adonis documents the impact of the group in his book "5 Days in May", designed in his view to give the impression of 'spontaneous' protest. Adonis incorrectly describes the project as Labour led. The founders of Take Back Parliament said that it was a cross party group of activists, with the first meeting to form the campaign hosted by Power2010 and operational execution undertaken by staff of Power2010, with support from Unlock Democracy. Some limited support and advice was given by Compass and Labour Students.

TBP presented itself as a coalition of groups campaigning for electoral reform, including the Electoral Reform Society, Friends of the Earth, the National Union of Students, and many others.

The first action of Take Back Parliament was a demonstration in Trafalgar Square on 8 May 2010, two days after the general election, attended by 2,000 people, which ended up in Smith Square, where the Liberal Democrat party was discussing whether to join the Conservative Party in a coalition government. This was followed by other actions around the country, including a flashmob in London on May 10 to pressure the Liberal Democrats to only accept a coalition deal if included a commitment to proportional representation.

It called a second national demonstration outside Parliament on 28 May 2010, which it claimed had an attendance of 2,500 people. This ended up outside Downing Street.

== Petition for 'Fair Votes' ==
Take Back Parliament began collecting signatures on 6 May 2010 on a petition with the text "This Parliament does not represent us. We demand fair votes now. There must never again be an election under this broken system." As of 5 August 2011, the petition has 57,710 signatures.

== 2011 United Kingdom Alternative Vote referendum ==
Take Back Parliament took a leading role in the campaign for the Alternative Vote (AV) voting system during the 2011 referendum.

As AV, despite being a change to Britain's first-past-the-post voting system, was not a proportional system, the group held a consultation with those who signed its petition and its social media supporters. The result was that a majority supported either campaigning for AV as a step to proportional representation, or as an end in itself. TBP therefore announced it would be campaigning for the Alternative Vote in the referendum “as a stepping stone to PR, but only after other options are exhausted”.

== The 'AV Bill' ==
During the passage of the Parliamentary Voting Systems and Constituencies Bill, which, among other things, legislated for the referendum to take place, there was much controversy over the coalition government's decision to combine, in one Bill, both the referendum and the redrawing of Parliamentary constituencies. This led to accusations that the Bill was a "backroom deal", with the Alternative Vote favouring the Liberal Democrats and the boundary changes helping the Conservatives. However, the Independent newspaper also argued that there was nothing wrong with the principle of equalizing constituencies, and called on the opposition Labour party to constructively amend the Bill, rather than reject it outright.

The row over the Bill also led to the infamous House of Lords filibuster.

The controversy extended to TBP, with some, such as national co-ordinator Andy May, arguing that the Bill should be split into two separate pieces of legislation. In any event, the Bill was passed as composite legislation and was signed into law just before the deadline set by the Electoral Commission.

The group supported moves by some MPs to amend the Parliamentary Voting Systems and Constituencies Bill so that the electorate had a choice of a proportional voting system in the referendum. These amendments were unsuccessful.

== Local groups ==
Most of TBP's existing local branches - for example, in North and South London, Birmingham and Edinburgh - became local groups of the Yes to Fairer Votes campaign, the officially designated Yes campaign in the referendum.

== Aftermath ==
Following the rejection of AV by the electorate, Take Back Parliament returned to being an independent campaign group. It has now wound up, and its email list is held by Unlock Democracy.

== See also ==
- Chartism
- Elections in the United Kingdom
- Electoral reform
- Electoral Reform Society
- History of suffrage in the UK
- Make Votes Matter
- Politics of the United Kingdom
- Suffragette
