= Electoral Reform Society =

British advocacy group for electoral reform

- Abbreviation: ERS
- Founded: 16 January 1884; 142 years ago London, United Kingdom
- Type: Non-governmental organisation
- Purpose: Democracy, electoral reform, elections
- Location: London, Cardiff, Edinburgh
- Region served: United Kingdom
- Method: Lobbying, research, innovation
- Key people: Darren Hughes, Chief Executive; Jon Walsh, Chair; Dan Snow, Ambassador
- Affiliations: Proportional Representation Society of Ireland (1911–1922)
- Website: www.electoral-reform.org.uk
- Formerly called: Proportional Representation Society

The Electoral Reform Society (ERS) is an independent advocacy organisation in the United Kingdom which promotes electoral reform. It seeks to replace first-past-the-post voting with proportional representation, advocating the single transferable vote, and an elected upper house of Parliament. It is the world's oldest still-extant electoral reform campaign.

== Overview ==
The Electoral Reform Society seeks a "representative democracy fit for the 21st century." The society advocates the replacement of the first-past-the-post and plurality-at-large voting systems with a proportional voting system, the single transferable vote. First-past-the-post is currently used for elections to the House of Commons and for most local elections in England and Wales, while plurality-at-large is used in multi-member council wards in England and Wales, and was historically used in the multi-member parliamentary constituencies before their abolition.

It also campaigns for improvements to public elections and representative democracy, and is a regular commentator on all aspects of representation, public participation and democratic governance in the United Kingdom.

== History ==
The ERS was founded in January 1884 as the Proportional Representation Society by the polymath and politician John Lubbock. By the end of the year, the society had attracted the support of 184 Members of Parliament, split almost equally between Conservatives and Liberals. Other early members included Charles Dodgson (better known as Lewis Carroll), C. P. Scott, editor of The Manchester Guardian and Thomas Hare, inventor of the Single Transferable Vote. The initial aim of the society was to have proportional representation included in the terms of the Representation of the People Act 1884 and the Redistribution of Seats Act 1885 (48 & 49 Vict. c. 23), but, despite a determined campaign of political lobbying, it was unable to do so.

A PRS pamphlet of the 1920s described the organisation's aims thus:

1. to reproduce the opinions of the electors in parliament and other public bodies in their true proportions
2. to secure the majority of electors shall rule and all other considerable minorities shall be heard
3. to give electors a wider freedom in the choice of representation
4. to give representative greater independence by freeing them from the pressure of sectional interests (perhaps party discipline and back-room deals were meant)
5. to ensure to parties representation by their ablest and most trusted members.

Alongside its sister organisation, Proportional Representation Society of Ireland, the society succeeded in getting STV introduced in local and then national elections in Ireland, and in numerous religious, educational and professional organisations. Prior to the 1920 Irish local elections, the first to use STV, the Local Government Board for Ireland secured the assistance of the PRS in educating voters on the new system.

Following World War II, the society suffered from financial problems and a lack of public appetite for reform. When Fianna Fáil put to a referendum a proposal to revert to first-past-the-post voting twice (1959 and 1968), the society, under the leadership of Enid Lakeman, led a successful campaign to keep the STV system in Ireland.

In 1973, the STV was introduced in Northern Ireland for elections to local councils and to the new Northern Ireland Assembly, and the society and its staff were called upon to advise in the programme of education set up by the government to raise public awareness.

Interest in proportional representation revived sharply in Britain after the February 1974 general election. From then on, the society was able to secure a higher public profile for its campaigns. In 1983, the society was recognised by the United Nations Economic and Social Council as a non-governmental organisation with consultative status.

== Activities ==
The society has campaigned successfully for the introduction of STV for local elections in Scotland, and led the call for a referendum on the voting system in the wake of the United Kingdom parliamentary expenses scandal as part of the Vote for a Change campaign. It is a founding member of the Votes at 16 Coalition.

=== AV referendum ===
The society was later a principal funder of the YES! To Fairer Votes campaign in the unsuccessful bid for a Yes vote in the 2011 referendum on the Alternative Vote. Its chief executive, Katie Ghose, served as the campaign's chair.

=== Police and crime commissioners ===
In 2012, the Society criticised Government handling of its policy of elected Police and crime commissioners – which led to the lowest turnout in British peacetime history.

In August 2012, the society predicted turnout could be as low as 18.5% and outlined steps to salvage the elections, mobilising support from both candidates and voters. The Government did not change tack, dubbing the prediction a "silly season story". Following the result (in which the national turnout was a mere 15.1%, even lower than the society's prediction), the Society branded the Government's approach to elections as a "comedy of errors", views that were reiterated by Shadow Home Secretary Yvette Cooper.

=== Voter registration ===
The society led bids to change the Government's approach to introduction of Individual Electoral Registration, which the New Statesman dubbed "the biggest political scandal you've never heard of". Electoral Commission sources estimated as many as 10 million voters could disappear from the electoral roll under government plans, predominantly poor, young or black, and more liable to vote Labour. The society succeeded in securing changes to the legislation.

=== European Union ===
In a 2014 report, the society recommended several ways to make the European Union more accountable and argued that there was a democratic deficit. These included: better scrutiny of EU legislation by the British parliament, a voting system which gives voters more influence over individual candidates (e.g. single transferable vote) and recruitment of party candidates with a wider ranges of views on the EU.

=== Analysis of 2016 EU referendum ===
In August 2016, the society published a highly critical report on the referendum and called for a review of how future events are run. Contrasting it very unfavourably with the 'well-informed grassroots' campaign for Scottish independence, ERS Chief Executive Katie Ghose described it as "dire" with “glaring democratic deficiencies” which left voters bewildered. Katie Ghose noted a generally negative response to establishment figures with 29% of voters saying David Cameron (a Remain supporter) made them more likely to vote leave, whilst only 14% said he made them want to vote remain. Looking ahead, the society called for an official organisation to highlight misleading claims and for Ofcom to define the role that broadcasters are expected to play.

=== 2018 gender analysis ===
In February 2018, the ERS reported that hundreds of seats were being effectively 'reserved' by men, holding back women's representation. Their report states that 170 seats are being held by men first elected in 2005 or before – with few opportunities for women to take those seats or selections.

=== Labour for a New Democracy ===
In September 2020, the Electoral Reform Society joined with other pressure groups (including Labour Campaign for Electoral Reform) and Labour MPs to launch Labour for a New Democracy, a campaign to "build support for UK electoral reform in Labour with the aim of changing party policy by the time its next conference takes place". According to polling, three-quarters of Labour members believe the party should commit to supporting proportional representation and adopt it as a policy. The motion for the September 2021 Labour Party conference was defeated despite 80% of CLP delegates voting in favour, due to an overwhelming vote against by the affiliated trade unions, most of which at the time did not have policy on electoral reform. In October 2021, the trade union Unite changed its policy to back proportional representation.

In June 2022, the trade union Unison also voted to support proportional representation. Other unions that have declared their support for proportional representation include the Associated Society of Locomotive Engineers and Firemen (ASLEF), the Musicians' Union (MU) and the Transport Salaried Staffs' Association (TSSA). Politicians from all wings of the Labour Party have come out in support of proportional representation, including the former leader of Welsh Labour and former First Minister of Wales, Mark Drakeford when he was in office.

At the Labour Party Conference in September 2022, delegates from CLPs and trade unions voted overwhelmingly in favour of adopting proportional representation. The motion is not binding on the party leadership but does commit the party to include PR in its election manifesto. Although during his leadership campaign, Labour Party leader, Keir Starmer, said: "I also think on electoral reform, we’ve got to address the fact that millions of people vote in safe seats and they feel their vote doesn’t count. That’s got to be addressed." It has subsequently been reported that he has always opposed proportional representation.

== Related organisations ==
- Electoral Reform Services Limited (ERS, formerly Electoral Reform Ballot Services): a company established by the Electoral Reform Society in 1988 to provide an independent balloting and polling service to organisations conducting elections and polls. The service is widely used by trade unions, political parties, building societies and companies when balloting their members or shareholders in ways defined by the law and their internal management. In many cases, these organisations are forbidden from conducting their ballots internally in an attempt to ensure that the ballots are conducted impartially. Until 2018 the Electoral Reform Society remained a minority shareholder and was in large part financed by its dividend from Electoral Reform Services. In 2018 Electoral Reform Services was sold to Civica, becoming Civica Election Services. The majority of the Electoral Reform Society's income is now financed by a capital fund set up with the proceeds from this sale.

== See also ==
- Make Votes Matter
- Take Back Parliament
- Suffragette
- Chartism
- History of suffrage in the United Kingdom
- Electoral reform in the United Kingdom
- Elective dictatorship
