= Electoral reform =

Change in an electoral system

Electoral reform is a change in electoral systems that alters how public desires, usually expressed by cast votes, produce election results.

== Types of reforms ==
Reforms can include changes to:

- Voting systems, such as the adoption of proportional representation, single transferable voting, a two-round system (runoff voting), instant-runoff voting (alternative voting, ranked-choice voting, or preferential voting), instant round robin voting (called condorcet voting), range voting, approval voting, citizen initiatives, referendums, and recall elections
- Vote-counting procedures
- Rules about political parties, typically changes to election laws
- Eligibility to vote (including widening of the vote, enfranchisement and extension of suffrage to those of certain age, gender or race/ethnicity previously excluded)
- How candidates and political parties are able to stand (nomination rules) and how they are able to get their names onto ballots (ballot access)
- Electoral constituencies and election district borders, which can include consideration of multiple-member districts as opposed to single-member districts
- Ballot design and voting equipment
- Scrutineering (election monitoring by candidates, political parties, etc.)
- Safety of voters and election workers
- Measures against bribery, coercion, and conflicts of interest
- Financing of candidates' and referendum campaigns
- Factors which affect the rate of voter participation (voter turnout)

Electoral reforms can contribute to democratic backsliding or may be advances toward wider and deeper democracy.

The International Standards Organisation has started to formulate norms with regards to conducting elections of an acceptable quality ISO/TS 54001 is the quality management system with particular requirements for the application of ISO 9001:2015 for electoral organizations at all levels of government.

=== Nation-building ===
In less democratic countries, dissidents often demand the holding of fair elections. Therefore, the most basic electoral-reform project in such countries is the establishment of a democratically elected government, in the best case scenario with a minimum of bloodshed, e.g. in South Africa in 1994. Such power transfers can be complex, and they tend to require changes to national or other constitutions to alter the balance of powers. Electoral reforms are often politically painful. The previously ruling authorities sometimes postpone reforms and fair elections as long as possible but, by doing so, risk social unrest, rebellion, political violence and civil war.

=== Reform in electoral boundaries ===
Electoral constituencies (or ridings or districts) need to be adjusted frequently, or by statutory rules and definitions, to eliminate malapportionment due to population movements. In some systems, this is done by moving the boundaries to take in more or fewer residents; in other systems, districts stay as they are and when necessary the number of members in the district is increased or decreased.

Multi-member districts are a component of many proportional representation systems. Where they are used, the number of seats in a district (not the districts' boundaries) may be altered. This satisfies one of the reasons to change electoral district boundaries: to ensure that the ratio between the number of voters (or population) and each of the members in the district is the same across districts.

The use of districts of different district magnitudes, with varying numbers of seats in each district perhaps ranging from one to ten or more, allows representation of electoral districts to be changed to be broadly proportional to the number of voters while retaining pre-existing districts, such as city corporate limits, counties or even provinces or states.

The lack of respect for "natural" boundaries (municipalities, community, infrastructure or natural areas) is a noted disadvantage of the single-member districts that are necessary for first-past-the-post voting. The lack of "natural" boundaries also appears in some criticisms of proposed reforms, such as the Jenkins Commission's proposal of the alternative vote plus system for the United Kingdom, because of its use of artificial single-member districts.

Some electoral reforms seek to have district boundaries match pre-existing jurisdictions or cultural or ecological criteria (with the number of district members adjusted, when necessary, to reflect population changes). Bioregional democracy sets boundaries to fit exactly with ecoregions to seek to improve the management of commonly owned property and natural resources. Fixing districts in place is a way to avoid gerrymandering, in which constituency boundaries are set to deliberately favor one party over another.

== Political difficulties ==
In most democracies, the electoral system is set by law, and the law is changed by a legislature whose members were elected under the system being changed. Rational-choice accounts of electoral reform therefore treat parties as actors that support a new system when they expect it to increase their share of seats. In a model developed by Benoit, an electoral system changes when some party or coalition that is able to change it, under the existing rules for changing electoral laws, expects to win more seats under an alternative.

Boix argues that, as long as the electorate does not change and the existing system serves the ruling parties well, they have no incentive to alter it.

Colomer finds that existing parties tend to choose electoral systems that consolidate the party configuration that already exists rather than create a new one. Reforms that go against the interests of the parties in power have therefore usually needed pressure from outside the legislature.

=== Difficulties common to all reform types ===
Several difficulties arise whatever the type of reform:

- Who decides. Renwick distinguishes two routes to major reform in established democracies. In elite majority imposition, a group of politicians able to change the system imposes a change in its own interest. In elite–mass interaction, a minority of politicians takes up reform but cannot pass it alone; public mobilization then pushes the remaining politicians to accept it. Where the electoral system is written into the constitution, as in Ireland, changing it requires a referendum, which moves the decision from the legislature to the voters. Where citizens can initiate legislation, reformers can bypass the legislature entirely, as in Switzerland in 1918 and in Maine in 2016.
- Uncertainty. Parties cannot always predict how a new system will affect them. Andrews and Jackman find that, under extreme uncertainty, parties tended to choose some form of proportional representation as the safest option, and that some parties approved rules that later eliminated them from politics.
- Parties are not unitary. The interests of party leaders and of individual legislators can differ. Cox, Fiva and Smith found that, in Norway's 1919 votes on proportional representation, party leaders were more likely than rank-and-file members to vote for it, even after accounting for the parties' expected seat gains and the socialist threat in each legislator's district.
- Motives other than seats. Seat share is not the only interest at stake. Renwick, Hanretty and Hine show that Italy's 2005 reform was imposed by the ruling coalition to protect its power, but that its motives cannot be reduced to maximizing seats.

=== Electoral thresholds ===
An electoral threshold excludes parties below a minimum share of the vote. Raising it moves seats from the smallest parties to the larger ones, and parties that are already below the threshold have no members in the legislature that votes on it. Matakos and Xefteris model office-seeking parties under uncertainty and show that, when the dominant parties all have good chances of winning, they agree to replace proportional representation with a more majoritarian rule, and that the rule they choose is more disproportional the larger the expected vote of the minor parties.

An example is Israel's Knesset, which has raised its threshold three times: from 1% to 1.5% before the 1992 election, to 2% from the 2006 election, and to 3.25% in March 2014. Such changes can have consequences their authors did not foresee. In 1992, the right-wing Tehiya list received 1.2% of the vote and fell below the new threshold, which made it possible for Yitzhak Rabin and the Labor Party to form a government.

A threshold may also be lowered when a governing party, or one of its allies, risks falling below it. Turkey had used a 10% threshold since the early 1980s. In March 2022 the governing AKP and its ally the MHP lowered it to 7%, at a time when polls put the MHP at about 7%, down from 11.1% in the previous election.

=== Single-winner voting methods ===
Switching from plurality voting to another single-winner method, such as instant-runoff voting, changes who can win single-member seats, including the seats of the legislators who vote on the change. In Australia, such a reform passed when the governing side was itself losing seats because of vote splitting. The rise of the Country Party after the First World War split the non-Labor vote. In the 1918 Swan by-election, Labor won with 34.4% of the vote while the two non-Labor candidates together received 60%. Preferential voting was introduced later that year so that the non-Labor parties would no longer split the vote and deliver seats to Labor.

Where legislators had no such interest, reforms have come through citizen initiatives, and legislators have sometimes tried to reverse them. In 2016, Maine voters approved ranked-choice voting in a citizen initiative, 388,273 to 356,621. In 2017, the legislature passed a law that delayed it and would have repealed it unless the constitution was amended; supporters then gathered signatures for a "people's veto" of that law. Voters approved the veto in June 2018 with 53.9% of the vote. In Alaska, a 2024 ballot measure to repeal the state's ranked-choice and open-primary system failed by 743 votes after a recount. Meanwhile, state legislatures have moved to prohibit ranked-choice voting: by March 2026, 19 U.S. states had banned it, six of them in 2024 and six in 2025.

=== To and from proportional representation ===
A move from majoritarian rules to proportional representation costs seats for any party that wins a majority of seats with a minority of votes, so a dominant party seldom adopts it. Boix finds that ruling parties shifted to proportional representation when new parties were strong and no established party was dominant; where one established party was dominant, or the new parties were weak, majoritarian rules were kept. Under this view, proportional representation served the established parties as insurance against decline.

Proportional representation has often been adopted, or rejected, through decisions in which voters, rather than legislators alone, had the final say:

- In Switzerland, popular votes rejected proposals to replace the majoritarian system for the National Council in 1900 and 1910, before a third proposal was approved in 1918 with 66.8% of the vote. At the next election the dominant Liberal-Radicals fell from 103 seats to 60.
- In New Zealand, an indicative referendum in 1992 and a binding one in 1993 replaced first-past-the-post with mixed-member proportional representation. Renwick treats New Zealand, together with the reforms in Italy and Japan in the early 1990s, as cases of elite–mass interaction.
- In British Columbia, a single transferable vote system proposed by a citizens' assembly received 57.7% support in a 2005 referendum but failed to reach the 60% threshold that had been set for it.
- In Ireland, the governing Fianna Fáil party proposed in 1959 and again in 1968 to replace the single transferable vote with first-past-the-post. Because the system is part of the constitution, the proposals went to referendums, and voters rejected them both times.

Where the electoral system is set by ordinary legislation, a governing majority can change it in either direction. In France, a law of 10 July 1985 replaced the two-round system with departmental list proportional representation before the 1986 election. The right-wing majority elected under that system restored the two-round system, and France, despite several partisan reforms, has always returned to it. In Italy, the ruling coalition replaced the mixed-member system in 2005 with proportional representation adjusted by a majority bonus.

Reforms of the executive can follow the same pattern. Israel's Knesset, elected by proportional representation, introduced direct election of the prime minister in 1992; its supporters argued that it would weaken the smaller sectarian parties. The reform had unintended consequences, and the Knesset later restored the parliamentary system.

=== District boundaries ===
Where legislators draw their own districts, the boundaries they choose can affect their own re-election (see electoral boundaries and gerrymandering). Before 2008, the California State Legislature drew the boundaries of its own districts. In 2008 voters approved Proposition 11, a citizen initiative that gave this task to an independent Citizens Redistricting Commission. In 2010 voters extended the commission's role to congressional districts and rejected a proposal to abolish it.

=== Theoretical models ===
In social choice theory, a voting rule that would be kept if it were used to decide whether to replace itself is called self-selective or self-stable (see self-selective voting rules). Koray proved that, among unanimous and neutral rules, only dictatorial rules choose themselves against every possible rival in every situation. Barberà and Jackson showed that a rule is easier to keep stable when changing it requires a larger majority than ordinary decisions do. Azrieli and Kim suggest that this is one reason societies use more demanding rules for changing their voting rules than for ordinary decisions. Gafni studies rules that are changed by the rule currently in force. Under some assumptions about voters' beliefs, he finds that only dictatorships are stable, and that any other rule can reach a dictatorship through a sequence of approved changes. These models assume that the people who vote under a rule are also the ones who decide whether to change it. In electoral reform the decision is usually made by legislators, who also weigh the effect of a new rule on their own seats.

== Strategies recommended for reformers ==
Practical guidance on how to achieve electoral reform comes mostly from studies of a small number of cases, from intergovernmental organizations and from practitioners. Several recommendations recur.

Taking the decision away from incumbents. Nagel describes lessons learned from the New Zealand reform. He lists eleven conditions that favour successful and lasting reform. Two of them address the self-interest of incumbents directly: a process in which the decision is taken out of the hands of elected politicians, without creating a new bias in favour of the status quo; and a specific proposal from an impartial, prestigious body that can justify it convincingly. In New Zealand that role was played by a Royal Commission, which recommended mixed-member proportional representation. Where the decision is given to a citizens' assembly, the OECD has published good-practice principles for designing such deliberative processes.

Building public support. Nagel's other conditions include widespread discontent partly blamed on the electoral system, a persistent grassroots movement, a well-funded and impartial public education campaign, and some luck, such as blunders by opponents. Kuo adds that reformers must agree on which democratic values are at stake and be precise about the alternative they want, since no electoral system is best in every respect.

Renwick draws several lessons from the defeat of the alternative vote in the United Kingdom's 2011 referendum. Reformers need a convincing account of why the change would help; an early lead in the polls may not last; reform from below depends on public anger with the existing system; voters tend to keep the status quo when they see no clear benefit in change; and arguments should be framed around what voters value, which in that campaign meant being able to remove an unpopular representative.

Choosing the route. Strano and Pocasangre have estimated that passing a reform through a state legislature usually takes at least four election cycles. After years of lobbying, no legislature had adopted statewide ranked-choice voting, whereas two states adopted it by ballot initiative. Practitioners nonetheless advise trying the legislative route first, or in parallel, and treating an initiative as the path of last resort when legislatures will not act.

Protecting the reform. Reforms adopted by initiative can be weakened or repealed by the legislature afterwards, and legislatures have also raised the approval thresholds that initiatives must meet. Proponents have responded by proposing constitutional amendments rather than ordinary statutes, because amendments are harder for legislatures to undo. Nagel recommends committing to try a new system for several elections before any major review. International IDEA's handbook notes that defects are hard to correct once interests form around a system, and advises that any planned review be written into the law from the start.

Fair process. The same handbook recommends an inclusive design process, warning that a decision driven by narrow partisan interest undermines acceptance of the result. It also recommends computer simulations and mock elections to explain the effects of a new system and to expose problems before it is used. The Venice Commission's Code of Good Practice in Electoral Matters, which addresses the risk that incumbents change the rules to their own advantage, recommends that the fundamental elements of electoral law, including the electoral system itself and constituency boundaries, not be amended less than one year before an election, or else be placed in the constitution. As a more flexible alternative, it suggests providing that a newly amended system takes effect only after the next election.

=== Role of United Nations ===
The United Nations Fair Elections Commission provides international observers to national elections that are likely to face challenges by the international community of nations, e.g., in 2001 in Yugoslavia, in 2002 in Zimbabwe.

The United Nations standards address safety of citizens, coercion, scrutiny, and eligibility to vote. They do not impose ballot styles, party diversity, or borders on electoral constituencies. Various global political movements, e.g., labour movements, the Green party, Islamism, Zionism, advocate various cultural, social, ecological means of setting borders that they consider "objective" or "blessed" in some other way. Contention over electoral constituency borders within or between nations and definitions of "refugee", "citizen", and "right of return" mark various global conflicts, including those in Israel/Palestine, the Congo, and Rwanda.

== See also ==
- Electoral reform by country
