= 2011 United Kingdom Alternative Vote referendum =

2011 referendum in the UK on reforming the voting system

United Kingdom Alternative Vote referendum
- 5 May 2011
- At present, the UK uses the "first past the post" system to elect MPs to the House of Commons. Should the "alternative vote" system be used instead?

Results
Choice	Votes	%
Yes	6,152,607	32.10%
No	13,013,123	67.90%
Valid votes	19,165,730	99.41%
Invalid or blank votes	113,292	0.59%
Total votes	19,279,022	100.00%
Registered voters/turnout	45,684,501	42.2%
- Results by local voting area No: 50–55% 55–60% 60–65% 65–70% 70–75% 75–80% Yes: 50–55% 55–60% 60–65%

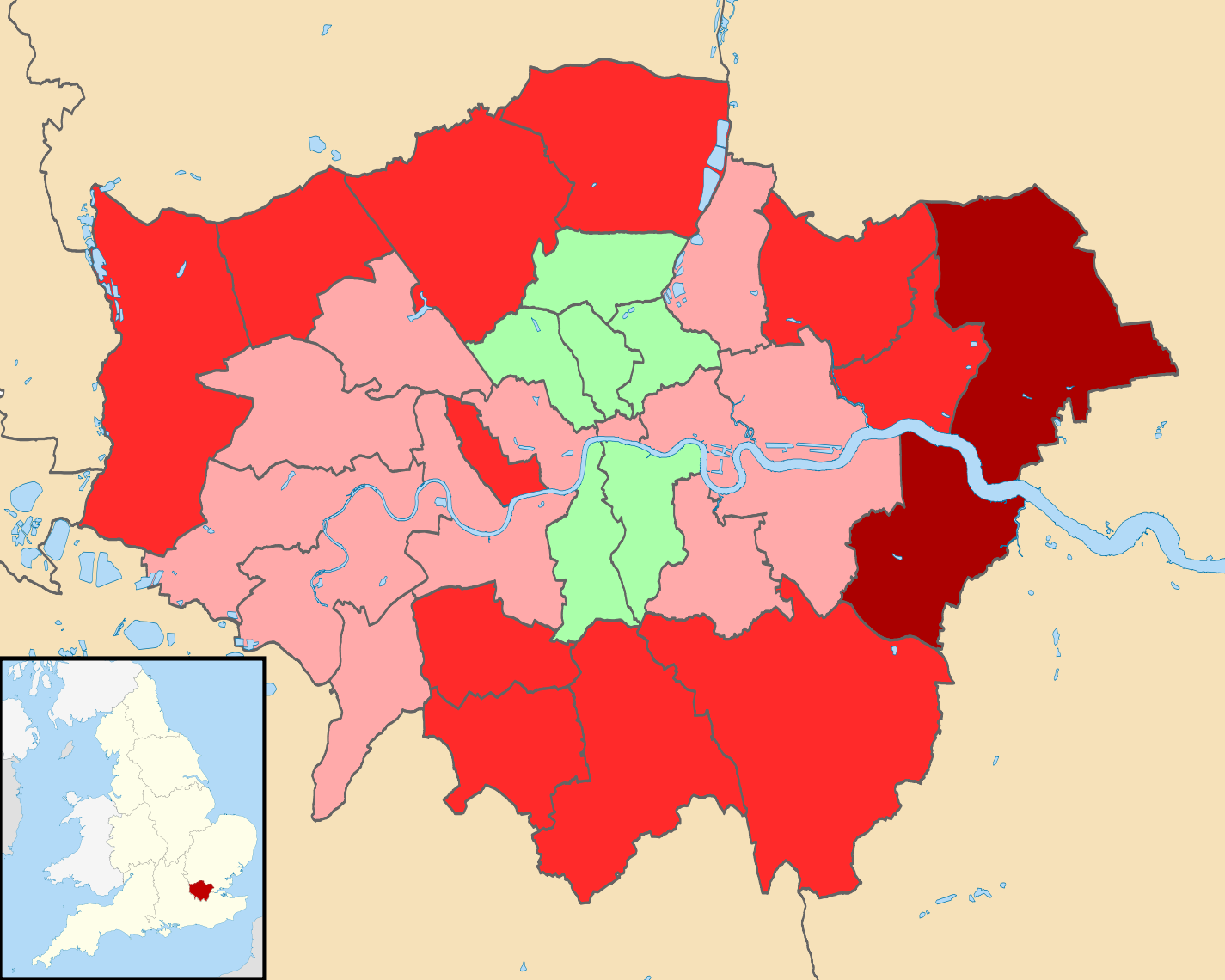
Results, Greater London UK district

The United Kingdom Alternative Vote referendum, also known as the UK-wide referendum on the Parliamentary voting system, was held on Thursday 5 May 2011 in the United Kingdom to choose the method of electing MPs at subsequent general elections. It occurred as a provision of the Conservative–Liberal Democrat coalition agreement drawn up in 2010 (after a general election that had resulted in the first hung parliament since February 1974) and also indirectly in the aftermath of the 2009 expenses scandal. It operated under the provisions of the Parliamentary Voting System and Constituencies Act 2011 and was the first national referendum to be held under provisions laid out in the Political Parties, Elections and Referendums Act 2000. Many local elections were also held on this day.

The referendum concerned whether to replace the present "first-past-the-post" system with the "alternative vote" (AV) method and was the first national referendum to be held across the whole of the United Kingdom in the 21st century. The proposal to introduce AV was rejected by 67.9% of voters on a national turnout of 42%. The failure of the referendum was considered a humiliating setback for Liberal Democrat leader Nick Clegg, who had acquiesced to the Conservative offer of a referendum on AV rather than proportional representation (PR) as part of the coalition agreement. The referendum was linked to the ongoing decline of his popularity and that of the Liberal Democrats in general.

This was only the second UK-wide referendum to be held (the first was the EC referendum in 1975) and the first of such to be overseen by the Electoral Commission. It is to date the only UK-wide referendum to be held on an issue not related to the European Communities or the European Union, and is also the first to have been not merely consultative: it committed the government to give effect to its decision.

All registered electors over 18 (British, Irish and Commonwealth citizens living in the UK and enrolled British citizens living outside) – including members of the House of Lords (who cannot vote in UK general elections) – were entitled to take part. On a turnout of 42.2 percent, 68 percent voted "No" and 32 percent voted "Yes". Ten of the 440 local voting areas recorded "Yes" votes above 50 per cent: four were Oxford, Cambridge, Edinburgh Central and Glasgow Kelvin, with the remaining six being in London.

== History ==
=== Historical context ===
The alternative vote and the single transferable vote (STV) for the House of Commons were debated in Parliament several times between 1917 and 1931, and came close to being adopted. Both the Liberals and Labour at various times supported a change from non-transferable voting to AV or STV in one-, two- and three-member constituencies. STV was adopted for university seats (which were abolished in 1949). Both AV and STV involve voters rank-ordering preferences and using ranked votes. However, STV uses multi-member constituencies and is considered to be a form of proportional representation, while AV uses single-member constituencies and is not a form of PR.

In 1950, all constituencies became single-member and all votes non-transferable. From then until 2010, the Labour and Conservative parties, the two parties who formed each government of the United Kingdom normally by virtue of an overall majority in the Commons, always voted down proposals for moving away from this uniform first-past-the-post (FPTP) voting system for the Commons. Other voting systems were introduced for various other British elections. STV was reintroduced in Northern Ireland and list-PR introduced for European elections except in Northern Ireland.

Whilst out of power, the Labour Party set up a working group to examine electoral reform. The resulting Plant Commission reported in 1993 and recommended the adoption, for elections to the Commons, of the supplementary vote, the system used to elect the Mayor of London. Labour's 1997 manifesto committed the party to a referendum on the voting system for the Commons and to setting up an independent commission to recommend a proportional alternative to FPTP to be put in that referendum.

After winning the 1997 general election, the new Labour government consequently set up the Jenkins Commission into electoral reform, supported by the Liberal Democrats, the third party in British politics in recent years and long supporters of proportional representation. (The Commission chair, Roy Jenkins, was a Liberal Democrat peer and former Labour minister.) The commission reported in September 1998 and proposed the novel alternative vote top-up or AV+ system. Having been tasked to meet a "requirement for broad proportionality", the Commission rejected both FPTP, as the status quo, and AV as options. It pointed out (chapter 3, para 21) that "the single-member constituency is not an inherent part of the British parliamentary tradition. It was unusual until 1885...Until [then] most seats [districts] were two-member..." (referring to the English system established in 1276). Jenkins rejected AV because "so far from doing much to relieve disproportionality, it is capable of substantially adding to it". AV was also described as "disturbingly unpredictable" and "unacceptably unfair".

However, legislation for a referendum was not put forward. Proportional systems were introduced for the new Scottish Parliament and Welsh and London Assemblies, and the supplementary vote was introduced for mayoral elections. With House of Lords reform in 1999, AV was introduced to elect replacements for the remaining 92 hereditary peers who sit in the Lords.

At the next general election in 2001, Labour's manifesto stated that the party would review the experience of the new systems (in Scotland, Wales and Northern Ireland) and the Jenkins report, to assess the possibility of changes to the Commons, which would still be subject to a referendum. Electoral reform in the Commons remained at a standstill, although in the Scottish Parliament, a coalition of Labour and the Liberal Democrats introduced STV for local elections in Scotland.

=== Before 2010 general election ===
In February 2010, the Labour government (which had been in power since 1997) used its majority to pass an amendment to its Constitutional Reform Bill to include a referendum on the introduction of AV to be held in the next Parliament, citing a desire to restore trust in Parliament in the wake of the 2009 expenses scandal. A Liberal Democrat amendment to hold the referendum earlier, and on STV, was defeated by 476 votes to 69. There was insufficient time remaining in the term of that Parliament for the Bill to become law before Parliament was dissolved; and so the move was dismissed by several Conservative and Liberal Democrat MPs as a political manoeuvre.

In the ensuing 2010 general election campaign, the Labour manifesto supported the introduction of AV via a referendum, to "ensure that every MP is supported by the majority of their constituents voting at each election". The Liberal Democrats argued for proportional representation, preferably by single transferable vote, and the Conservatives argued for the retention of FPTP. Both the Conservatives and Liberal Democrats proposed reducing the number of MPs, while the Conservative Party argued for more equal sized constituencies.

=== Election outcome to Queen's Speech ===
The 2010 UK general election held on 6 May resulted in a hung parliament, the first since 1974, leading to a period of negotiations. Honouring a pre-election pledge, the Liberal Democrat leader Nick Clegg entered into negotiations with the Conservatives as the party who had won most votes and most seats. William Hague offered the Liberal Democrats a referendum on the alternative vote as part of a "final offer" in the Conservatives' negotiations for a proposed "full and proper" coalition between the two parties. Hague and Conservative leader David Cameron said that this was in response to Labour offering the Liberal Democrats the alternative vote without a referendum, although it later emerged that Labour had not made such an offer. Negotiations between the Liberal Democrats and Labour quickly ended. On 11 May 2010, Prime Minister Gordon Brown stepped down, followed by the establishment of a full coalition government between the Conservatives and Liberal Democrats. David Cameron became Prime Minister and Liberal Democrat leader Nick Clegg became Deputy Prime Minister.

The initial Conservative–Liberal Democrat coalition agreement, dated 11 May 2010, detailed the issues which had been agreed between the two parties before they committed to entering into coalition. On the issue of an electoral reform referendum, it stated:

The parties will bring forward a Referendum Bill on electoral reform, which includes provision for the introduction of the Alternative Vote in the event of a positive result in the referendum, as well as for the creation of fewer and more equal sized constituencies. Both parties will whip their Parliamentary Parties in both Houses to support a simple majority referendum on the Alternative Vote, without prejudice to the positions parties will take during such a referendum.

Following the agreement between the Conservatives and Liberal Democrats, with the new coalition government now formed, a commitment to the referendum was included in the coalition government's Queen's Speech on 25 May 2010 as the Parliamentary Reform Bill, although with no date set for the referendum.

The coalition agreement committed both parties in the government to "whip" their Parliamentary parties in both the House of Commons and House of Lords to support the bill, thereby ensuring that it could reasonably be expected to be passed into law due to the simple majority in the Commons of the combined Conservative – Liberal Democrat voting bloc. The Lords can only delay, rather than block, a Bill passed by the Commons.

=== Passage through Parliament ===
According to The Guardian, reporting after the Queen's Speech, unnamed pro-referendum Cabinet members were believed to want the referendum held on 5 May 2011, to coincide with elections to the Scottish parliament, the Welsh assembly and many English local councils. Nick Clegg's prior hope of a referendum as early as October 2010 was considered unrealistic due to the parliamentary programme announced in the speech.

On 5 July 2010, Clegg announced the detailed plans for the Parliamentary Reform Bill in a statement to the House of Commons, as part of the wider package of voting and election reforms set out in the coalition agreement, including setting the referendum date as 5 May 2011. In addition to a referendum on AV, the reform bill also included the other coalition measures of reducing and resizing the Westminster parliamentary constituencies, introducing fixed-term parliaments and setting the date of the next general election as 7 May 2015, changing the voting threshold for early dissolution of parliament to 55%, and providing for the recall of MPs by their constituents.

The plans to hold the vote on 5 May faced criticism from some Conservative MPs as distorting the result because turnout was predicted to be higher in those places where local elections were also held. It also faced criticism from Scottish, Welsh and Northern Irish MPs for the effects it would have on their devolved elections on the same day, while Clegg himself faced further criticism from Labour, and implied lessening support from Liberal Democrat MPs, for backing down on earlier Liberal Democrat positions on proportional representation. Clegg defended the date, stating the referendum question was simple and that it would save £17m in costs. Over 45 MPs, mostly Conservatives, signed a motion calling for the date to be moved. In September 2010, Ian Davidson MP, chairman of the Commons Scottish affairs select committee, stated after consultation with the Scottish Parliament that there was "unanimous" opposition among Members of the Scottish Parliament (MSPs) to the referendum date, following the "chaos" of the combined 2007 Scottish parliament and council elections.

On 22 July 2010, the proposal for fixed-term parliaments was put before parliament as the Fixed-term Parliaments Bill, while the proposals for the AV referendum, change in dissolution arrangements and equalising constituencies were put forward in the Parliamentary Voting System and Constituencies Bill, which accordingly had three parts: Part 1, Voting system for parliamentary elections; Part 2, Parliamentary constituencies; and Part 3, Miscellaneous and general. The Bill contained the text of a proposed referendum question.

The original proposed question in English was:

Do you want the United Kingdom to adopt the "alternative vote" system instead of the current "first past the post" system for electing Members of Parliament to the House of Commons?

In Welsh:

Ydych chi am i'r Deyrnas Unedig fabwysiadu'r system "bleidlais amgen" yn lle'r system "first past the post" presennol ar gyfer ethol Aelodau Seneddol i Dŷ'r Cyffredin?

permitting a simple YES / NO answer (to be marked with a single (X)).

This wording was criticised by the Electoral Commission, saying that "particularly those with lower levels of education or literacy, found the question hard work and did not understand it". The Electoral Commission recommended a changed wording to make the issue easier to understand, and the government subsequently amended the Bill to bring it into line with the Electoral Commission's recommendations.

The Bill passed an interim vote in the Commons on 7 September 2010 by 328 votes to 269.

An amendment proposed in the Lords by Lord Rooker (Independent) to require a minimum turn-out of 40% for the referendum to be valid was supported by Labour, a majority of cross-benchers and ten rebel Conservatives, and was passed by one vote. Labour's 2010 AV referendum proposal had not included such a threshold and they were criticised for seeking to impose one for this referendum, while the 2011 Welsh referendum, held under a Bill passed by Labour, also had no threshold (and would have failed if it had had one, as turnout in that referendum was only 35%). In the latter hours of debate, a "game" of parliamentary ping-pong saw the Commons overturning the threshold amendment before it was reimposed by the Lords, and then removed again.

After some compromises between the two Houses on amendments, the Bill was passed into law on 16 February 2011.

== Legislation ==
The Parliamentary Voting System and Constituencies Act 2011 provided for the holding of the referendum, and the related changes had it led to the adoption of AV. Passing the bill into law was a necessary measure before the referendum could actually take place. It received Royal assent on 16 February 2011.

The Act has the following long title:

An Act to make provision for a referendum on the voting system for parliamentary elections and to provide for parliamentary elections to be held under the alternative vote system if a majority of those voting in the referendum are in favour of that; to make provision about the number and size of parliamentary constituencies; and for connected purposes

=== Referendum question ===
Based on the coalition agreement, the referendum was a simple majority yes/no question as to whether to replace the current first-past-the-post (FPTP) electoral system used in general elections with the alternative vote (AV) system.

The question posed by the referendum was:

At present, the UK uses the "first past the post" system to elect MPs to the House of Commons. Should the "alternative vote" system be used instead?

In Wales, the question on the ballot paper also appeared in Welsh:

Ar hyn o bryd, mae'r DU yn defnyddio'r system "y cyntaf i’r felin" i ethol ASau i Dŷ'r Cyffredin. A ddylid defnyddio’r system "pleidlais amgen" yn lle hynny?

permitting a simple YES / NO answer (to be marked with a single (X)).

== Administration ==
The referendum took place on 5 May 2011, coinciding with various United Kingdom local elections, the 2011 Scottish Parliament election, the 2011 Welsh Assembly election and the 2011 Northern Ireland Assembly election. The deadline for voters in England, Wales and Northern Ireland to register to vote in the referendum was midnight on Thursday 14 April 2011, whilst voters in Scotland had until midnight on Friday 15 April 2011 to register. Anyone in the United Kingdom who qualified as an anonymous elector had until midnight on Tuesday 26 April 2011 to register. In the vote count, the referendum ballots in England, Scotland and Wales were counted after the various election ballots, from 4 pm on 6 May 2011. The referendum had no minimum threshold on the required turnout needed for the result to be valid.

Anyone on the electoral register and eligible to vote in a general election was entitled to vote in the referendum. This includes British citizens living outside the UK who were registered as overseas electors. In addition, Members of the House of Lords, who are not eligible to vote in a general election, were entitled to vote in the referendum, provided they were entitled to vote in local elections or European Parliamentary elections.

== Campaign positions ==
=== Political parties ===
Political parties' position on the referendum	For a "Yes" vote (introduce AV)	No official party position	For a "No" vote (oppose AV)
Parties elected to the House of Commons	Liberal Democrats; Scottish National Party; Sinn Féin; Plaid Cymru; Social Democratic and Labour Party; Green Party of England and Wales; Alliance Party of Northern Ireland	Labour Party	Conservative Party; Democratic Unionist Party
Parties elected to the European Parliament or regional assemblies / parliaments	UKIP; Scottish Greens		British National Party; Ulster Unionist Party; Green Party in Northern Ireland
Minor parties	Liberal Party; Mebyon Kernow; English Democrats; Christian Party; Christian Peoples Alliance; Pirate Party UK; Libertarian Party	Socialist Party of Great Britain; Official Monster Raving Loony Party; Socialist Equality Party	Traditional Unionist Voice; Respect Party; Communist Party of Britain; Socialist Party; Alliance for Workers' Liberty

==== Coalition parties ====
The coalition partners campaigned on opposite sides, with the Liberal Democrats supporting AV and the Conservatives opposing it.

Despite the Conservative Party's formal position, party members who were aligned to the Conservative Action for Electoral Reform, an internal party group in favour of electoral reform, campaigned in favour, while a BBC News report described "some Tory MPs" as being "relaxed" about a "Yes" result. Some Conservatives campaigned in favour of AV, e.g. Andrew Boff AM; and Andrew Marshall, former head of the Conservative Group on Camden Council. The Conservative Party uses a system of successive ballots to elect its leader, which has been described as a "form of AV" (since the candidate with the fewest votes is eliminated in each round), but unlike AV, the candidates are not ranked in order of preference during each ballot.

==== Other parties represented in the House of Commons ====
Labour elected a new leader following the 2010 general election and many of the leadership candidates supported AV, including winner Ed Miliband; however, Andy Burnham was critical of the referendum. Former interim Labour Leader Margaret Beckett was president of the No to AV campaign. Other supporters of the party also used the referendum to attack the coalition and voiced opposition to the bill currently providing for the referendum, on the grounds of the inclusion of boundary changes that are viewed as beneficial to the Conservative Party.

Plaid Cymru supported AV, but did not take an active role in the campaign, as it focused on separate Welsh votes on the same day. The Scottish National Party, while maintaining its longstanding support for PR-STV, also supported a "Yes" vote in the referendum. Both of these parties opposed the planned referendum date, as they did not want it held at the same time as the 2011 Welsh Assembly elections and the 2011 Scottish Parliament elections respectively.

Among the Northern Irish parties, the Alliance Party and the Social Democratic and Labour Party (SDLP) supported AV. SDLP leader Margaret Ritchie announced that her party would actively campaign in favour. Sinn Féin also supported a "Yes" vote, but the Democratic Unionist Party supported a "No" vote.

The Green Party of England and Wales voted in favour of joining the campaign for AV in the referendum at its September 2010 party conference. Many leading figures in the party supported the change as a step towards their preferred system, proportional representation. Previously, the party's leader and only MP, Caroline Lucas, had called for a referendum that included a choice of proportional representation. However, at the party's Conference, Deputy Leader Adrian Ramsay argued that "If you vote No in this referendum, nobody would know whether you were rejecting AV because you wanted genuine reform, or were simply opposing any reform."

==== Minor parties ====
The UK Independence Party's National Executive Committee formally announced that it would be supporting Alternative Vote, although it would prefer a proportional system. An e-mail was sent to members informing them that they might vote against AV, but were not allowed to campaign.

The British National Party criticised AV and supported a "No" vote.

The Respect Party also supported proportional representation and campaigned against AV. Rob Hoveman, on behalf of Tower Hamlets Respect, wrote to the East London Advertiser on 24 February 2011 urging a "No" vote on the grounds that the AV system created an even greater imbalance between votes and seats, and urging a proportional system instead.

The Scottish Green Party also supported AV, although it prefers the adoption of STV for all elections.

The Ulster Unionist Party and Traditional Unionist Voice supported a "No" vote. The Green Party Northern Ireland also opposed the change to AV, as they viewed it as a betrayal of proportional representation.

The English Democrats, the Christian Peoples Alliance and the Christian Party all supported AV. Pirate Party UK endorsed a "Yes" vote, with over 90% of members expressing support for AV.

The Liberal Party agreed to support the "Yes" campaign, seeing AV as "a potential 'stepping stone' to further reform" and STV.

The Communist Party of Britain opposed AV.

Mebyon Kernow, the Cornish nationalist party, favoured proportional representation and was disappointed that the referendum did not give voters that option. However, leader Dick Cole announced on 1 April 2011 that Mebyon Kernow would be supporting the "Yes" campaign.

The United Kingdom Libertarian Party favoured AV as a slight improvement on first-past-the-post.

The Socialist Party of Great Britain adopted a neutral position, arguing "what matters more is what we use our votes for" in the context of class struggle.

The Socialist Party opposed AV, pointing out that it is not more proportional than First Past the Post.

The Alliance for Workers' Liberty opposed AV, arguing that it did not offer progress on the party's main democratic demands.

The Socialist Equality Party stated that the only vote "worth registering" on that day was for their candidates in two local English council elections, declaring both choices "undemocratic" and the referendum itself "an exercise in political cynicism" reached as a part of a "squalid backroom manoeuvre" that is ultimately intended to sustain British capitalism.

==== Politicians ====
Prime Minister David Cameron of the Conservative Party and Deputy Prime Minister Nick Clegg of the Liberal Democrats made speeches backing the "No" and "Yes" campaigns respectively on the same day, but were thereafter not expected to take much part in the campaigns, although both were active since. Cameron described AV as "undemocratic, obscure, unfair and crazy". He was praised for his intervention by back-bench Conservative MPs.

Labour leader Ed Miliband said he would take an active part in the "Yes" campaign, while Wales's First Minister and Welsh Labour Leader Carwyn Jones and Scottish Labour Leader Iain Gray both also supported AV. Also supporting the "Yes" campaign were over 50 Labour MPs including Alan Johnson, Peter Hain, Hilary Benn, John Denham, Liam Byrne, Sadiq Khan, Tessa Jowell, Ben Bradshaw, Douglas Alexander, Alistair Darling, Diane Abbott and Debbie Abrahams. Labour peers supporting the "Yes" campaign include Peter Mandelson, Oona King, Raymond Plant (chair of Labour's 1993 working group on electoral reform), Andrew Adonis, Anthony Giddens, former Labour leader Neil Kinnock, former deputy leader Roy Hattersley and Glenys Kinnock, while further Labour figures supporting AV included former Mayor of London Ken Livingstone, Michael Cashman MEP, Tony Benn, and former Labour council candidate and wife of the Speaker Sally Bercow.

The Liberal Democrats supported a "Yes" vote and many individual Liberal Democrat politicians were active in the "Yes" campaign. The SNP leader, Alex Salmond, supported a "Yes" vote. UKIP supported a "Yes" vote and their principal spokesmen on the campaign were William Dartmouth MEP and party leader, Nigel Farage MEP.

Supporting the "No" campaign were both senior Conservative (including William Hague, Kenneth Clarke, George Osborne, Theresa May, Philip Hammond, Steven Norris and Baroness Warsi) and Labour politicians (including John Prescott, Margaret Beckett (president of the No to AV campaign), David Blunkett, John Reid, Tony Lloyd, John Healey, Caroline Flint, Hazel Blears, Beverley Hughes, Paul Boateng, John Hutton and Lord Falconer). The Conservative Party announced that seven MPs (Conor Burns, George Eustice, Sam Gyimah, Kwasi Kwarteng, Charlotte Leslie, Priti Patel, Chris Skidmore) and two former candidates (Chris Philp and Maggie Throup, later elected as MPs) would act as party spokespersons in the "No" campaign. Overall, most Labour MPs supported the "No" campaign rather than the "Yes" campaign, with other notable opponents of AV including Paul Goggins, Ann Clwyd, Sir Gerald Kaufman, Austin Mitchell, Margaret Hodge, Lindsay Hoyle, Jim Fitzpatrick, Dennis Skinner and Keith Vaz. Also supporting a "No" vote were crossbencher and former SDP leader Lord Owen, who supported the No to AV But Yes to PR campaign.

Conservative politician Michael Gove was initially mistakenly announced by the No to AV campaign as opposing AV, but his advisers stated that he had never been involved in the campaign and had not yet made up his mind. Over five Labour MPs announced as opposing AV were also found to have been wrongly included: for example, Alun Michael supported a "Yes" vote, while Meg Hillier did not lend her name to either campaign.

Some Conservative politicians did support AV, including John Strafford, a former member of the Conservative Party's national executive, who chaired the Conservative campaign in favour of a "Yes" vote.

=== Other organisations ===
==== AV campaigning organisations ====
Two campaign groups were established in response to the proposed referendum, one on each side of the debate. NOtoAV was established to campaign against the change to the alternative vote and YES! To Fairer Votes was established to campaign in favour.

==== Political reform groups ====
Take Back Parliament, the Electoral Reform Society, Make My Vote Count, and Unlock Democracy all campaigned in favour of the change to AV.

==== Trade unions ====
The GMB Union opposed the change to AV. It provided "substantial" sums of money to the "No" campaign and marshalled its members to vote "No". Unions generally supported the "No" campaign, with only Billy Hayes, general secretary of the Communication Workers' Union, supporting AV.

==== Think tanks ====
Compass supported the change to the AV and urged the Labour Party to do so too. It preferred a switch to a more proportional system, but viewed AV as superior to FPTP. ResPublica supported the change to AV and urged the Conservative Party to do so too. Policy Exchange opposed the change to AV. Ekklesia supported the change to AV.

A report by the Institute for Public Policy Research in January 2011 was very critical of FPTP's flaws, while a report in April 2011 came down in support of AV over FPTP. However, the IPPR also previously called for a wider choice in the referendum and favours Alternative Vote Plus over FPTP or AV.

==== Academics ====
A number of academics entered the debate, either in mainstream media or through blogs, social networking or academic publication.

Those in favour of AV included Timothy Gowers (Cambridge), David Held (LSE), Patrick Dunleavy (LSE), and Helen Margetts (Oxford), Thom Brooks (Newcastle University), Alastair McMillan (Sheffield), and Ben Saunders (Stirling).

Dan Felsenthal (LSE) criticised AV as "deeply flawed", though he also described it as "a minor improvement on the current first-past-the-post system". David S. Moon (Sheffield) argued that AV would be worse than FPTP, though he regarded both as flawed and supported a move to proportional representation.

At a Voting Power in Practice workshop, held at the Chateau du Baffy, in France from 30 July to 2 August 2010, 22 voting theory specialists voted to select the "best voting procedure" to elect a candidate from a selection of three or more. First past the post received no votes, compared to 10 for AV, although another system, Approval Voting (not on offer in the referendum), received 15 votes.

On 11 March, 29 historians, including Niall Ferguson, Simon Sebag Montefiore, Andrew Roberts and David Starkey, wrote to The Times expressing opposition to the adoption of the Alternative Vote.

==== Other organisations ====
Greenpeace and Friends of the Earth supported the Yes! To Fairer Votes campaign, as did the Joseph Rowntree Reform Trust, Operation Black Vote, the New Economics Foundation, 38 Degrees and bassac. Educational trust The Constitution Society worked to increase public awareness of the issues involved in the debate.

=== Media ===
The Guardian, The Independent, the Daily Mirror, and the Financial Times supported the change to AV. The Daily Mail, The Times, the Daily Express and The Daily Telegraph opposed AV. The Economist supported a "No" vote, but did want to see reform of the current electoral system. Socialist daily newspaper the Morning Star urged a "No" vote, on the basis that AV would be no more fair than FPTP; the paper argued for single transferable vote instead.

==== Campaigners and celebrities ====
Supporting the "Yes" campaign were campaigner and musician Billy Bragg; broadcaster and Labour peer Melvyn Bragg; campaigner and actress Joanna Lumley; Labour supporter and broadcaster Tony Robinson; designer and ethical fashion campaigner Amisha Ghadiali; Annette Lawson, chairwoman of the national alliance of women's organisations; and Simon Woolley, director and co-founder of Operation Black Vote. AV was also supported by Kevin Maguire, associate editor of the Daily Mirror newspaper, and journalist Polly Toynbee.

Celebrities supporting a "Yes" vote included comedian David Mitchell, comedian and actor Eddie Izzard, author Naomi Alderman, playwright Bonnie Greer, comedian Francesca Martinez, actress Helena Bonham Carter, Oscar award-winning actor Colin Firth, actor and Liberal Democrat supporter John Cleese, comedian Stephen Fry, actor Art Malik, John O'Farrell, actor Richard Wilson, editor and writer Rowan Davies, broadcaster Greg Dyke, co-founder of the Ministry of Sound James Palumbo, actor and comedian David Schneider, Kriss Akabusi, Chris Addison, Josie Long, Benjamin Zephaniah and Honor Blackman. Comedian and actor Steve Coogan also supported a "Yes" vote.

Supporting a "No" vote were television presenter Esther Rantzen, scientist and Labour peer Lord Winston; nightclub impresario Peter Stringfellow, cricketers David Gower and Darren Gough, Olympic rower James Cracknell and F1 boss Sir Frank Williams. Actor and television presenter Ross Kemp also backed the "No" campaign.

==== Religious figures ====
Also supporting the "Yes" campaign were several Church of England bishops: Michael Langrish, Bishop of Exeter; Colin Buchanan, former area Bishop of Woolwich; Alan Smith, Bishop of St Albans; John Packer, Bishop of Ripon and Leeds; Martyn Jarrett, Bishop of Beverley; Nigel Stock, Bishop of St Edmundsbury and Ipswich; Alan Wilson, Bishop of Buckingham; Michael Perham, Bishop of Gloucester; Peter Dawes, former Bishop of Derby; and David Atkinson, former Bishop of Thetford.

Jonathan Bartley (founder and co-director of the Ekklesia religious thinktank, and who was later co-leader of the Green Party) supported the referendum.

=== Others ===
Anti-corruption campaigner, former broadcaster and independent MP, Martin Bell supported AV. A group of leading businesswomen and campaigners published a letter in The Guardian backing a "Yes" vote on 28 April 2011, with signatories including Alexandra Shulman (editor of Vogue), illustrator Daisy de Villeneuve, writer Gillian Slovo, human rights lawyer Helena Kennedy, Hilary Wainwright (editor of Red Pepper), journalist Isabel Hilton, Jacqueline Rose, writer Jay Griffiths, broadcaster Joan Bakewell, rabbi Julia Neuberger, fashion designer Patsy Puttnam, journalist Polly Toynbee, Janet Todd (President of Lucy Cavendish College, Cambridge), Chair of Young Labour Susan Nash, activist Tamsin Omond, financial consultant Tessa Tennant, fashion designer Vivienne Westwood, gynaecologist/campaigner Wendy Savage and journalist Yasmin Alibhai-Brown.

== Campaign donors and spending ==
By around the beginning of May, the "Yes" campaign had spent £3.4 million compared to £2.6 million by the "No" campaign.

The "Yes" campaign revealed that it had raised £2 million (as of 15 February 2011), with 95% coming from two donors, the Electoral Reform Society and the Joseph Rowntree Reform Trust. The "Yes" campaign also received five-figure sums from Alan Parker, who is close to both Gordon Brown and David Cameron, and Paul Marshall, a donor to the Liberal Democrats.

There were initially accusations in the press that the "No" campaign was refusing to publish details of their donors and the "Yes" campaign was quicker than the "No" campaign in doing this, but subsequently said on 18 February 2011 they would do so before the referendum date. However, they had not done so by 28 March 2011 when the "Yes" campaign published an updated list of all donors of over £7,500, and launched a petition calling on the "No" campaign to do the same.

The "No" campaign released a list of donors on 9 April 2011, which included several major donors to the Conservative Party, including Lord (John) Sainsbury, Michael Farmer, Lord Harris, Lord Fink and Lord Edmiston. In total, the "No" campaign had raised by that date £1.8m in donations of over the declarable limit of £7,500 from 41 donors, with the largest being from billionaire Peter Cruddas, founder of the CMC spread betting firm, who gave £400,000.

The Guardian newspaper identified 42 of the 53 named donors to the "No" campaign as donors to the Conservative Party, while one, the GMB union, is a donor to the Labour Party, and nine were not identified in official donor records. The remaining donor is official funding from the electoral commission. The donors include seven Conservative peers. They quote Margaret Beckett, a leading Labour "No" campaigner, as saying this situation is a "necessary evil".

While the "Yes" campaign released figures of all donations over the declarable limit after it was set up, the "No" campaign did not declare any donations prior to the referendum bill receiving Royal assent, for it was not required to do under the relevant regulations. David Blunkett, a "No" campaigner, called on the "No" campaign to do so.

== Campaign ==
The initial part of the campaign was overshadowed by continuing Parliamentary battles over the introducing Bill, which had threatened to delay the referendum date. Launching their campaign, supporters of AV argued that the need for candidates to campaign for later preferences would encourage candidates to appeal to a broader cross-section of the electorate. They also pointed out the declining number of people voting for the main two parties in the UK over recent decades.

=== Party politics ===
The "Yes" campaign sought to present its campaign as being on behalf of members of the public. The "No" campaign sought to play on the unpopularity of the leader of the Liberal Democrats, Nick Clegg, and to present the referendum as an opportunity to punish Clegg at the polls. It also claimed that Clegg described AV as "a miserable little compromise" before the 2010 general election. The fuller quote says: "I am not going to settle for a miserable little compromise thrashed out by the Labour Party." However, the Conservatives rejected the possibility of introducing PR in coalition negotiations, leading to a referendum in which the choice was between FPTP and AV.

While officially supporting a "No" vote, the Conservative Party leadership reportedly initially held back on campaigning and advised major Conservative Party donors not to donate to the "No" campaign. However, this position changed in January 2011 and the leadership became more involved, with requests to donors to fund the "No" campaign and staff and party headquarters becoming directly involved in campaigning.

In mid-February, the prime minister, David Cameron, and the deputy prime minister, Nick Clegg, made opposing speeches advocating a "No" and "Yes" result respectively. Clegg argued that AV would mean "fairer votes" and that FPTP produced more safe seats, and linked these to the MPs' expenses scandal. He said that AV would encourage politicians to work to appeal to more of the electorate rather than just their core supporters. He stated that "I think this [AV] is a natural evolution which reflects the fact that politics is no longer now, as it was 50 years ago when everybody was very happy to plump for the blue corner or the red corner, people want more choice now."

Cameron, in contrast, argued that FPTP delivers more accountability, and claimed it reduces the number of hung parliaments. He insisted that "when it comes to our democracy, Britain shouldn't have to settle for anyone's second choice." He also claimed, on BBC Radio 4's Today programme on 3 May 2011, that AV would undermine the fundamental principle of "one person, one vote". Despite the coalition parties being on different sides in the campaign, Cameron insisted that "whatever the result", the coalition would continue.

Caroline Lucas, head of the Green Party of England and Wales said in support of AV that "they can vote for what they believe in and I think that will be very liberating for a lot of people".

=== Row over possible costs ===
The "No" campaign launched with a claim that choosing AV would cost £250 million. However, this figure was criticised on several grounds. For example, it included an estimated £82 million for holding the referendum, that would have applied whatever the referendum outcome, and failed to take into account costs saved from holding the referendum at the same time as other elections. The £250 million figure also included £130 million for the cost of electronic voting systems, although these were not used by the largest country then using AV, Australia, and there were no plans to use such machines if AV were introduced in the UK. (The referendum actually cost about £75 million, below estimates made at the time, according to the Electoral Commission.)

Labour MP Douglas Alexander described the figure claimed as a "lie". A Channel 4 News Fact Check concluded that the specific claim that AV would require electronic counting machines, the main component of the £250 million figure, was "fiction". Alan Renwick likewise dismissed the suggestion that voting machines would be required, saying "The No camp [...] say that AV would require expensive voting machines. [...] that is just plain false."

The Treasury stated that the adoption of AV would not lead to any spending cuts. Danny Alexander, the Liberal Democrat Chief Secretary to the Treasury and a supporter of AV himself, stated in a leaked letter that, "The Government has no plans to reopen departmental spending review settlements as a consequence of a "Yes" vote in the referendum on AV." He also told the Independent on Sunday newspaper: "I don't expect to see any increase in the cost of holding a general election if the British people vote yes. There's no good reason to believe that even under a new voting system an election would need to be more expensive."

The "No" campaign launched a series of advertisements on posters and in regional newspapers based on the £250 million figure. Ads included:

- A picture of a soldier's face, with "He needs bulletproof vests, NOT an alternative voting system. Say NO to spending £250million on AV. Our country can't afford it. NOtoAV".
- A similar ad featuring a picture of a sick baby in a tiny hat with an oxygen tube to the nose, eyes shut, hand outstretched. The copy includes: "She needs a new cardiac facility NOT an alternative voting system. On 5th May you'll be asked in a referendum whether you want to change our voting system to the Alternative Vote: a change that would cost our country at least £250million. Now is not the right time to be spending money that could be put to better use. Like a much-needed new Children's Heart Centre at Birmingham Children's Hospital." etc.
- Picture of pensioner, with "she needs home help not an alternative voting system" etc.

The "Yes" campaign described these as "shameful", a "smear" and "lies", and complained to the Electoral Commission and Advertising Standards Authority, both of whom stated that they did not have powers to regulate individual adverts in the campaign.

On 5 May, David Blunkett, one of the Labour Party former-government ministers who had supported the "No" campaign, admitted that the £250 million figure used by the "No" campaign had been fabricated, and that the "No" campaign had knowingly lied about the figure and other claims during the campaign.

=== Coalition and minority governments ===
Supporters of a "No" vote claimed that AV would lead to more coalition governments, but models of recent UK elections suggest that this may not be the case, The BBC had modelled the possible effect of AV on every general election since 1983 and concluded that the overall result would not have changed in any of them. Paddy Ashdown pointed out that in the twentieth century Australia had fewer hung Parliaments under AV than the UK had under FPTP. The report of the Independent Commission on the Voting System, issued in 1998, stated that "There is not the slightest reason to think that AV would reduce the stability of government; it might indeed lead to larger parliamentary majorities."

During the referendum campaign a BBC Newsnight special on the referendum suggested that AV would lead to a small increase in the number of hung results and Alan Renwick, author of A Citizen's Guide To Electoral Reform, wrote in Total Politics magazine that "AV makes election results more volatile, exaggerating landslides on the one hand and making coalitions more common on the other." However, Dennis Leech, a professor at Warwick University, has argued that coalitions will not be any more likely under AV. Vernon Bogdanor stated that:

AV would probably make little difference in most general elections. ... By helping the Lib Dems – the second choice of many voters – AV makes hung parliaments more likely. But the effect would probably not be very great. AV would not have transformed the result in any of the twelve postwar elections that yielded large working majorities. But the parliaments of 1951 and 1992 might have been hung, and AV might have given Labour a working majority in the indecisive elections of 1950, 1964, and February and October 1974.

The Channel 4 News FactCheck summarised the position as follows:

AV would not lead to permanent hung parliaments and coalition governments. The best academic research we have suggests that AV wouldn't make big landslides a thing of the past, and nor would it make hung Parliaments more likely ... hung parliaments are indeed more likely in the future. But that will be the case under both AV and FPTP.

=== "One person, one vote" ===
Under AV each voter casts a single transferable vote or ranked vote. The "No" campaign argued that some would get multiple votes under AV, and that the system was therefore contrary to the principle of "one person, one vote" (which they adopted as a slogan of their campaign). This argument was heavily criticised by Ipsos MORI, Channel Four News Fact Check, and many academic commentators. The FullFact site stated "some of these claims have trod a fine line between accuracy and error". The Ipsos MORI Guide to AV stated that:

this system [AV] does not involve some people getting more votes than others. Every voter gets just one vote, which is counted several times. Your second preference is not a second vote, it is an instruction about how you want your (only) vote to be used if it would be wasted because your first choice candidate can't win. Each vote is counted in each round" of counting.

=== Safe seats ===
The "Yes" campaign argued that AV would be fairer, and that it would reduce or even eliminate 'safe seats', making MPs work harder. This was contested by the "No" campaign, again with reference to Australia. This view was supported by Alan Renwick, who stated that "AV wouldn't significantly change the number of safe seats. Even the claim that AV would make a big dent in the number of safe seats goes further than the facts support." However, the New Economics Foundation think-tank, which supported a "Yes" vote, published modelling showing that with the introduction of AV the number of very marginal seats would have increased from 81 to 125, and the number of very safe seats would decrease from 331 to 271, although there would also have been an increase in the number of quite safe seats. The Foundation found that, with FPTP, the average number of seats changing hands per election was 13% and this could rise to 16% under AV, modestly increasing voter power overall, but concluded "that neither system is very good at translating votes into electoral power".

=== Majority support for MPs ===
The "Yes" campaign argued that AV would ensure that every MP was supported by an overall majority, more than 50% of the voters. However, in its Guide to AV, Ipsos MORI stated "this is not really true, but maybe it's a defensible simplification". AV ensures that a candidate is elected with the support of at least 50% of voters who have expressed a preference between the final two candidates in the contest. If some voters have indicated that they are indifferent between the final two, by not ranking either of them on the ballot paper, then the winner may be elected with the support of fewer than 50% of all votes cast.

Rawlings and Thrasher stated that "the claims that AV will guarantee local majority support can only be validated if every voter is compelled or chooses to cast a full range of preferences. There seems little prospect of that happening in a general election conducted under AV in the UK." The Channel 4 News FactCheck stated that it "is right that candidates will have to aim for 50% of votes, though it is true that some candidates will end up being elected on fewer than 50% of all the votes cast".

In the most recent general election, roughly two-thirds of MPs had been elected without an overall majority. Rawlings and Thrasher predicted that "more than four out of ten" MPs would still not have majority support under AV, while Ipsos MORI stated "It is certainly true that in many constituencies ... MPs elected under AV will have the support of a higher proportion of voters than they did under FPTP".

=== Existing use of voting systems in Britain and abroad ===
The "No" campaign argued that only three countries use AV. It also stated that the Australian public wish to do away with AV, although this claim has been contested by ABC elections analyst Antony Green. At the time of the referendum, three nations used AV for parliamentary elections: Australia, Papua New Guinea, and Fiji. However, AV is also used internationally for many other forms of election.

AV is used for Irish presidential elections and for by-elections in the Republic of Ireland, and in some local elections in New Zealand. In the United Kingdom, AV is used by MPs to elect the chairs of select committees, the Speaker of the House of Lords, and the Deputy Speakers of the House of Commons. AV is also used in by-elections to select hereditary peers for the House of Lords. A variant of AV called the supplementary vote was at the time used to elect the Mayor of London and the mayors of other UK cities. A related system called the exhaustive ballot is used to elect the Speaker of the House of Commons. AV is used for various elections in the United States (see AV in the United States).

AV is used by many private organisations in the UK, for example in the leadership elections of the Labour Party and the Liberal Democrats. AV is also used by the Royal British Legion, and in certain trade unions and students' unions. In the US, AV is now used to decide the winner of the Oscar for Best Picture.

A method similar to AV, called the two round system, is widely used internationally, although in that method voters only get one vote, and thus cannot rank options or have their votes transferred, and only the top two candidates move forward to the next round. For example, it is used to elect the National Assembly of France and the Presidents of eighty nations. The United States also uses primaries, followed by a second round, for the President, House of Representatives and the Senate.

PR-STV is another related system. It uses a preferential ballot like AV but is used for elections in multi-seat constituencies. It is used for national elections in the Republic of Ireland, Australia and Malta, for elections to the Northern Ireland Assembly, and for other purposes in many other nations.

The "No" campaign stressed that FPTP is used in over fifty countries, with a combined population of approximately 2.4 billion people. FPTP is used for legislature elections in the United States, India and Canada, as well as other non-G20 nations. It is used for presidential elections in twenty countries, and for various forms of election in 45 others (35 of these are Member states of the Commonwealth of Nations or British Overseas Territories).

=== Proportional representation ===
Some opponents of AV saw it as a stepping stone toward unwanted (for them) proportional representation, while some supporters of proportional representation saw the referendum as a lost opportunity that would delay a move to proportional representation. Both positions have been described as "entirely speculative". An Evening Standard editorial described the result of a "No" win: "the issue of electoral reform will be shelved for a generation". On the other hand, Thomas Lundberg, an electoral systems specialist at Glasgow University, wrote in a Political Studies Association paper: "Anything that reduces the ability of small parties to win seats – a process that has been going on since the 1970s at British general elections – could be detrimental to the prospect of a PR transition. Because AV raises the threshold to victory to 50 per cent plus one vote, small parties, which often win seats on low vote shares, might be threatened unless they can win significant numbers of transfers from voters who prefer other parties."

=== Tactical voting ===
Tactical voting means that a voter supports a candidate other than their sincere preference, in order to get a relatively desirable outcome. No conventional (i.e. ordinal) voting system can eliminate tactical voting (under the Gibbard–Satterthwaite theorem), and situations in which AV is susceptible to tactical voting can be demonstrated. The Yes to AV campaign argued that, under AV, such scenarios were rare or theoretical. The independent market research group Ipsos MORI has published a guide to AV. This states that the scenario in which tactical voting might influence the outcome of an AV election "is very easy to demonstrate in the case of AV and is unlikely to be especially rare". It is however true that, under AV, it is harder for the tactical voter to know what effect he is going to have so the prevalence of what is strictly defined as "tactical voting" may be reduced under AV.

First-past-the-post is a monotonic voting system, while AV meets independence of clones and mutual majority criteria.

=== AV and the BNP ===
The British National Party (BNP) supported a "No" vote in the referendum. In response, Conservative chairman and "No" supporter Baroness Warsi described AV as "a system which rewards extremism and gives oxygen to extremist groups". In response, the "Yes" campaign launched advertising with the slogan, "Say No to the BNP, Say Yes on 5th May" pointing out the BNP's opposition to AV. The Channel 4 News FactCheck concluded the "Yes" campaign was correct, saying:

AV is highly unlikely to help the BNP win any seats, and the secondary votes of BNP supporters alone wouldn't swing a seat for any other party – going on last year's results. In fact, in a very divided constituency, the BNP arguably has a better chance of winning a seat under First Past the Post than under AV.

The FactCheck went on to quote the BNP deputy chairman Simon Darby, who said: "AV is a retrograde step – it's worse than what we've got now[.] We are never going to get our feet under the table under the AV system." The No2AV-Yes2PR campaign website countered that "AV does confer a subtle benefit on extremists like the BNP: increased legitimacy. AV enables people to cast 'free' protest vote safe in the knowledge that they can they cast a second preference for the party they actually want."

Dennis Leech, a professor at Warwick University, has argued that extremists like the BNP are more likely to win under FPTP, but he has also argued against the notion that AV automatically favours centrists:

while AV prevents the kind of undemocratic result that often occurs under FPTP, and always ensures that the winning candidate has at least some kind of majority support, it has nothing to do with proportional representation. It does not follow that centrist or compromise candidates such as the LibDems will be more likely to win – only that the least popular cannot win. A centrist candidate such as a LibDem will still need enough first preference votes to stand a chance.

=== Final weeks ===
The final weeks of the campaign were marked by an increased rancour, with a battle of words between members of the Coalition government. For example, Liberal Democrat energy secretary Chris Huhne threatened legal action over "untruths" that he claimed were told by Conservative Chancellor George Osborne that new voting machines would be required by AV, despite these not being used in Australian elections under AV and no plans to introduce them. The "No" campaign countered, quoting a senior returning officer (Anthony Mayer), who said that voting machines would be essential with AV if results are desired as quickly as today, rather than counting over the weekend after a general election. See the row over possible costs section for a fuller discussion.

Huhne was reported to have strongly criticised Conservative colleagues at a Cabinet meeting in early May 2011 for the "No" campaign's material. However, one of the key "No" campaign leaflets he targeted, showing a newborn baby with the slogan "She needs a maternity unit, not an alternative voting system", was developed by Dan Hodges, a Labour Party campaigner working for NO2AV.

Leading members of the Labour Party on different sides of the campaign also stepped up to campaign for the votes of Labour supporters, including a major newspaper interview with Peter Mandelson in which he called for a "Yes" vote and a major advertising campaign by the Labour Yes to Fairer Votes group, both arguing that Labour voters should vote "Yes" because of Conservative support for a "No" result. However, the "No" campaign responded by pointing out that a majority of Labour MPs opposed AV (130 out of 255 opposing AV, 86 in support). In the last week a grassroots campaign featuring Reform Cat in the YouTube video "Is your Cat confused about the referendum on the voting system on the 5th May?" which was released on 27 April 2011, gained more views than either official campaign videos.

== Polling ==
LOESS regression graph of the polls conducted up to the referendum

Polling organisation	Poll was taken on behalf of	Was actual referendum question used?	Survey end date	AV (%)	FPTP (%)	Would not vote (%)	Don't know (%)	Ref	Notes
ComRes	Independent on Sunday	No	2010-05-13	59	32	—N/a	10		
ICM	Sunday Telegraph	No	2010-05-13	56	35	—N/a	9		
YouGov	Sun	No	2010-06-14	44	34	5	17		
YouGov	Sun	No	2010-06-28	42	34	5	18		
YouGov	Sun	No	2010-07-05	45	32	6	17		
YouGov	Sun	No	2010-07-19	39	38	7	17		
YouGov	Sun	No	2010-08-02	41	36	5	18		
YouGov	Sun	No	2010-08-16	37	38	7	18		
ICM	Guardian	No	2010-08-16	45	45	—N/a	10		
YouGov	Sun	No	2010-08-31	37	39	5	18		
YouGov	Constitution Society	No	2010-09-01	32	33	8	28		
YouGov	Sun	No	2010-09-06	35	39	8	18		
YouGov	Sun	No	2010-09-20	36	39	8	17		
YouGov	Sun	No	2010-10-04	35	40	7	18		
YouGov	Sun	No	2010-10-18	33	41	6	19		
YouGov	Sun	No	2010-11-01	32	43	8	17		
YouGov	Sun	No	2010-11-15	33	40	7	20		
ICM	Yes to fairer votes	Yes	2010-11-28	48	35	—N/a	17		
ICM	ERS	Yes	2010-11-28	35	22	9	35		
YouGov	Sun	No	2010-11-29	35	41	7	17		
ICM	Guardian	Yes	2010-12-03	44	38	—N/a	18		
ICM	ERS	Yes	2010-12-03	36	30	—N/a	34		
YouGov	Sun	No	2010-12-13	33	39	7	21		
YouGov		No	2010-12-14	32	40	9	19		
Angus Reid		Yes	2011-01-07	37	20	6	37		
YouGov	Sun	No	2011-01-10	32	41	8	18		
YouGov	Sun	No	2011-01-24	32	41	7	20		
YouGov	Sun	No	2011-02-07	38	39	7	16		
YouGov	Sun	No	2011-02-08	37	38	6	18		
ComRes	Independent on Sunday	Yes	2011-02-10	40	30	—N/a	30		
ComRes	Independent on Sunday	No	2011-02-10	40	30	—N/a	30		
ComRes	Newsnight	No	2011-02-13	41	41	—N/a	18		
Populus	Times	No	2011-02-13	41	29	—N/a	30		
Populus	Times	No	2011-02-13	29	43	9	20		
Angus Reid		Yes	2011-02-16	37	22	6	35		
ICM	Guardian	Yes	2011-02-20	37	37	—N/a	27		
YouGov	Sun	No	2011-02-21	34	41	7	18		
YouGov	No2AV	No	2011-02-28	32	43	7	17		
YouGov	No2AV	Yes	2011-03-01	33	30	6	30		
Angus Reid		Yes	2011-03-04	32	26	7	35		
YouGov	Sun	No	2011-03-07	30	47	8	15		
ComRes	Independent on Sunday	Yes	2011-03-10	34	37	—N/a	28		
YouGov	Sky News	Yes	2011-03-10	37	32	7	24		
Harris	Metro	Yes	2011-03-11	31	32	—N/a	37		
YouGov	Sunday Times	Yes	2011-03-18	39	37	1	23		
Angus Reid		Yes	2011-03-21	29	28	7	35		
YouGov	Sun	No	2011-03-21	32	44	7	17		
YouGov	Sun	No	2011-03-28	32	44	6	18		
YouGov	Sun	No	2011-03-30	31	44	7	18		
YouGov	Sunday Times	Yes	2011-04-01	40	37	1	22		
Populus	Times	No	2011-04-03	33	37	—N/a	30		
Populus	Times	No	2011-04-03	29	46	8	17		
YouGov	Sun	No	2011-04-04	34	42	7	17		
YouGov	Sunday Times	Yes	2011-04-08	39	38	1	22		
Angus Reid		Yes	2011-04-11	32	28	8	32		
YouGov	Sun	No	2011-04-11	33	45	6	15		
YouGov	Sun	Yes	2011-04-12	37	44	0	19		
ComRes	Independent on Sunday	Yes	2011-04-15	37	43	—N/a	21		
YouGov	Sunday Times	Yes	2011-04-15	40	41	1	17		
ICM	Guardian	Yes	2011-04-17	42	58	—N/a	—N/a		Includes Northern Ireland
TNS-BMRB	Independent	Yes	2011-04-18	32	34	13	20		
YouGov	Sun	Yes	2011-04-19	42	58	—N/a	—N/a		
Angus Reid		Yes	2011-04-21	42	58	—N/a	—N/a		
ICD	New Statesman	Yes	2011-04-25	39	53	—N/a	9		
ComRes	No2AV	Yes	2011-04-25	40	60	—N/a	—N/a		
YouGov	Sun	Yes	2011-04-26	41	59	—N/a	—N/a		
YouGov	Sunday Times	Yes	2011-04-29	45	55	—N/a	—N/a		
ComRes	Independent	Yes	2011-05-01	34	66	—N/a	—N/a		
ICM	Guardian	Yes	2011-05-03	32	68	—N/a	—N/a		
YouGov	Sun	Yes	2011-05-04	40	60	—N/a	—N/a		
Angus Reid		Yes	2011-05-04	39	61	—N/a	—N/a		

== Proposed AV system ==
=== System ===
Under the alternative vote system proposed in the referendum, voters would still be electing just one candidate associated with one geographic constituency. Instead of simply voting for one candidate on the ballot paper (with an "X"), the voter would instead be asked to rank one or more of the candidates in order of preference. If after first preferences have been counted, no one candidate has a majority of the votes cast, then the bottom candidate will be eliminated and votes for that candidate are transferred to each voter's next available preference. The process continues repeatedly until one candidate reaches a majority and wins. The system proposed was a form of "optional preferential voting", in that voters would not be obliged to rank every candidate in order of preference in order to cast a valid vote.

=== Ballot instructions ===
Schedule 10 to the Parliamentary Voting System and Constituencies Act 2011 proposed to amend Paragraph (5) of Rule 29 of Schedule 1 to the Representation of the People Act 1983 (the "Parliamentary Election Rules"), so that the instructions to the voter displayed in ballot boxes would be changed from an instruction to vote for only one candidate, to read:

"Remember—use 1, 2, 3 etc at this election—this is an election using the alternative vote system. Put the number 1 next to the name of the candidate who is your first choice (or your only choice, if you want to vote for only one candidate). You can also put the number 2 next to your second choice, 3 next to your third choice, and so on. You can mark as few or as many choices (up to the number of candidates) as you wish. Do not use the same number more than once. Put no other mark on the ballot paper, or your vote may not be counted."

This was repealed by the Parliamentary Voting System and Constituencies Act 2011 (Repeal of Alternative Vote Provisions) Order 2011.

== Voting areas and counts ==
The referendum was held nationally across all four countries of the United Kingdom as a single majority vote in 440 voting areas and twelve regional count areas. In England the districts were used as the voting areas before being combined into the nine regional count areas. In Scotland the constituencies of the Scottish Parliament were the voting areas, and in Wales the voting areas were the constituencies of the National Assembly for Wales and Northern Ireland was a voting area.

The following table shows the breakdown of the voting areas for the referendum within the United Kingdom.

Country	Counts and voting areas
United Kingdom	Referendum declaration; 12 regional counts; 440 voting areas

Constituent countries	Counts and voting areas
England	9 regional counts; 326 voting areas
Northern Ireland	National count and single voting area
Scotland	National count; 73 voting areas
Wales	National count; 40 voting areas

== Result ==
According to the Electoral Commission, the votes were first counted in the 440 voting areas across the United Kingdom. Except in Northern Ireland, the results from these local counts were relayed to twelve regional count areas to be officially announced by the regional counting officers. Scotland and Wales were each classed as one regional count area, so votes in those areas were counted and declared locally within Scottish Parliament and Welsh Assembly constituency boundaries before the results were declared nationally. Northern Ireland was also classed as a single regional count area but its votes were counted and declared nationally as one unit. In England, the votes were counted and declared locally at district council level, and those results were carried over to the nine remaining regional count areas. The national result for the whole United Kingdom was announced at the Platinum Suite at the Exhibition Centre London (ExCel) by the chief counting officer (CCO) and chair of the Electoral Commission, Jenny Watson, at 0100 BST on Saturday 7 May 2011 after all 440 voting areas and UK regions had declared their results. With a national turnout of 42% across the United Kingdom the target to secure the majority win for the winning side was 9,639,512 votes. The decision by the electorate was a decisive "No" vote to adopting the alternative vote system in all future United Kingdom general elections by a majority of 6,860,516 votes over those who had voted "Yes" in favour of the proposal.

Ahead of the last results from Northern Ireland, the result was confirmed as a "No", as it was mathematically impossible for the "Yes" voters to outnumber them.

2011 United Kingdom Alternative Vote referendum
Choice	Votes	%
Yes	6,152,607	32.10
No	13,013,123	67.90
Total	19,165,730	100.00
Valid votes	19,165,730	99.41
Invalid/blank votes	113,292	0.59
Total votes	19,279,022	100.00
Registered voters/turnout	45,684,501	42.20
Source: Electoral Commission

National referendum results (excluding invalid votes)
Yes; 6,152,607 (32.1%)	No; 13,013,123 (67.9%)
▲50%

=== Regional count results ===
Results by regions and countries

"Yes" votes percentages

Region	Electorate	Voter turnout, of eligible	Votes		Proportion of votes		Invalid votes
Region	Electorate	Voter turnout, of eligible	Yes	No	Yes	No	Invalid votes
East Midlands	3,348,469	42.8%	408,877	1,013,864	28.74%	71.26%	9,486
East of England	4,263,006	43.1%	530,140	1,298,004	29.00%	71.00%	11,218
Greater London	5,258,802	35.4%	734,427	1,123,480	39.53%	60.47%	4,561
North East England	1,968,137	38.8%	212,951	546,138	28.05%	71.95%	3,214
North West England	5,239,323	39.1%	613,249	1,416,201	30.22%	69.78%	19,273
Northern Ireland	1,198,966	55.8%	289,088	372,706	43.68%	56.32%	7,062
Scotland	3,893,268	50.7%	713,813	1,249,375	36.36%	63.64%	12,370
South East England	6,288,366	43.1%	823,793	1,951,793	29.68%	70.32%	12,594
South West England	4,028,829	44.6%	564,541	1,225,305	31.54%	68.46%	7,399
Wales	2,268,739	41.7%	325,349	616,307	34.55%	65.45%	5,267
West Midlands	4,093,521	39.8%	461,847	1,157,772	28.52%	71.48%	13,845
Yorkshire and the Humber	3,835,075	39.9%	474,532	1,042,178	31.29%	68.71%	13,722

=== Results by constituent countries ===
Results solely by country

"Yes" votes %

Country	Electorate	Voter turnout, of eligible	Votes		Proportion of votes		Invalid votes
Country	Electorate	Voter turnout, of eligible	Yes	No	Yes	No	Invalid votes
England	38,323,528	40.7%	4,786,532	10,724,067	30.86%	69.14%	95,322
Northern Ireland	1,198,966	55.8%	289,088	372,306	43.68%	56.32%	7,062
Scotland	3,893,269	50.7%	713,813	1,249,375	36.36%	63.64%	12,370
Wales	2,268,739	41.7%	325,349	616,307	34.55%	65.45%	5,267

== Outcome ==
Further details of campaigning decisions emerged after the referendum result, with Dan Hodges reporting that the Conservatives had endorsed the "No" campaign's targeting of Nick Clegg, although they had originally opposed the idea. Hodges also reported that an aide of David Cameron secretly met "No" campaign leaders in a hotel room in order to stop the Liberal Democrats finding out the scale of Conservative involvement.

The Coalition government continued and sought to present a united front after the fractious campaign. Former Conservative Cabinet minister Michael Portillo criticised Cameron, saying he "forgot the importance of courtesy" towards Clegg and the Liberal Democrats and, thus, the survival of the Coalition, when he joined what Portillo called "the disgraceful No campaign".

On 8 July 2011, the alternative vote provisions were repealed, bringing the statutory process that had initiated the referendum to an end.

The decisive "No" vote continues to be cited as an endorsement of first-past-the-post and a rejection of proportional representation, despite the fact that AV alone is not a proportional system. The Conservative government response to a 2016–17 parliamentary petition demanding proportional representation said that "A referendum on changing the voting system was held in 2011 and the public voted overwhelmingly in favour of keeping the FPTP system." Tim Ivorson of the electoral reform campaign group Make Votes Matter responded by quoting the petition's text that "The UK has never had a say on PR. As David Cameron himself said, the AV referendum was on a system that is often less proportional than FPTP, so the rejection of AV could not possibly be a rejection of PR."

Clegg, already unpopular for signing the coalition agreement with the Conservatives, saw his fortunes worsen. The referendum was linked to the steep ongoing decline of his popularity and that of the Liberal Democrats in general. The party would go onto lose 49 seats in the 2015 general election, plummeting from 23% to just 8% of the total national vote share.

== See also ==
- Electoral systems in the United Kingdom
- Electoral reform in the United Kingdom
- Post-truth politics
- Results of the 2011 United Kingdom Alternative Vote referendum
