= 2010 Special Honours =

British government recognitions

As part of the British honours system, Special Honours are issued at the Monarch's pleasure at any given time. The Special Honours refer to the awards made within royal prerogative, operational honours and other honours awarded outside the New Years Honours and Birthday Honours

== Life Peer ==
=== Baronesses ===
- Floella Benjamin, OBE, DL, Actor, Presenter and Campaigner on Children's Issues.
- Rita Margaret Donaghy, CBE, formerly Chair, Conciliation and Arbitration Service.
- Dee Doocey, OBE, Chair of the London Assembly.
- Jeannie Drake, formerly Deputy General Secretary, Communication Workers Union.
- Dame Ellen Margaret Eaton, DBE, Chairman, Local Government Association.
- Meral Hussein Ece, OBE, Local Government Councillor, Islington; Advocate of Equality issues.
- Dr. Dianne Hayter, Chair, Legal Services Consumer Panel.
- Anna Healy, formerly Government and Political Adviser.
- Judith Jolly, Chair of Executive Committee of Liberal Democrats in Devon and Cornwall.
- Susan Kramer, former Liberal Democrat MP.
- The Right Honourable Helen Lawrie Liddell, formerly Secretary of State for Scotland.
- Helen Margaret Newlove, Campaigner against anti- social behaviour.
- Susan Nye, formerly Director of Government Relations, Prime Minister's Office.
- Kathryn Jane Parminter, formerly Chief Executive, Campaign to Protect Rural England.
- Shireen Olive Ritchie, Local Government Councillor, particularly in social care for adults and children.
- Fiona Shackleton, LVO, lawyer specialising in family law.
- Deborah Stedman-Scott, OBE, DL, Chief Executive, Tomorrow's People, a national employment charity working in deprived areas of the United Kingdom.
- Maeve Christina Mary Sherlock, OBE, formerly Chief Executive, Refugee Council and formerly Special Adviser to the Chancellor.
- Patience Wheatcroft, Editor-in-Chief of the Wall Street Journal Europe.
- Margaret Wheeler, MBE, Director of Organisation and Staff Development, UNISON public service union.

=== Barons ===
- Sir Jeremy Hugh Beecham, DL. For services to English Local Government and first Chairman of the Local Government Association.
- Guy Vaughan Black, former Director, Press Complaints Commission; Executive Director, Telegraph Media Group.
- Sir Ian Warwick Blair, QPM, formerly Commissioner of the Metropolitan Police.
- The Right Honourable Paul Yaw Boateng, formerly Government Minister and MP for Brent South.
- Patrick Cormack, former Conservative MP.
- Michael Dobbs, author, presenter and adviser to Margaret Thatcher and John Major.
- Edward Peter Lawless Faulks, QC, Barrister, Leading Practitioner, Crime and Personal Injuries practice.
- Andrew Feldman, businessman and Co-Chairman of the Conservative Party.
- John Gardiner, Deputy Chief Executive, Countryside Alliance.
- Michael James German, OBE, formerly Deputy First Minister for Wales.
- Roy Kennedy, Director of Finance and Compliance, Labour Party.
- Alistair Cooke, OBE, career in education, authorship and politics.
- Roger John Liddle, formerly Special Adviser on Europe.
- Sir Kenneth Donald John MacDonald, QC, formerly Director of Public Prosecutions.
- The Right Honourable Dr. Jack Wilson McConnell, formerly First Minister for Scotland.
- John Stephen Monks, General Secretary, European Trades Union Confederation.
- Dolar Amarshie Popat, Chief Executive of TLC Group, specialising in Healthcare and Hospitality.
- Bernard Ribeiro, CBE, FRCS, retired Consultant General Surgeon; member of the Health Policy Research Advisory Board of the American College of Surgeons.
- John Sharkey, Chairman of the Liberal Democrat 2010 General Election campaign.
- John Warren Shipley, OBE, leading Local Government Councillor in Newcastle-upon-Tyne.
- Robert Wilfrid Stevenson, formerly Director, Smith Institute and Special Adviser to the Prime Minister.
- Nicholas True, CBE, past Deputy Head of the PM’s Policy Unit; former Private Secretary to the Leader of the Opposition in the House of Lords; Leader of Richmond Borough Council
- Nat Wei, Founder, Teach First and Founder, Future Leaders.
- Michael Williams, formerly Special Adviser on Foreign Affairs.
- The Honourable Simon Adam Wolfson, Chief Executive, Next plc.
