= Jenkins Commission =

Jenkins Commission may refer to:

- Jenkins Commission (UK) or Independent Commission on the Voting System, a commission formed to reform the voting system of the United Kingdom
- Jenkins Commission (EU), the European Commission that held office from 6 January 1977 to 6 January 1981; its president was Roy Jenkins
