= Contingent vote =

Single-winner ranked-voting electoral system

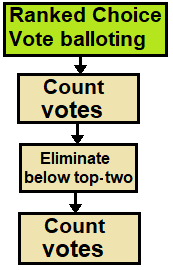
A flowchart for the contingent vote

The contingent vote electoral system elects a single representative through a two-stage process, in which the winner receives a majority of votes. It uses ranked voting. The voter ranks candidates in order of preference, and when the votes are first counted, only first preferences are counted. If no candidate has a majority (more than half) of the votes cast, then all but the two leading candidates are eliminated and the votes that had been received by the eliminated candidates are transferred to whichever of the two remaining candidates are marked as the next effective preference.

The contingent vote can be considered a compressed or "instant" form of the two-round system (runoff system), in which the second "round" is conducted without the need for voters to go to the polls a second time. The contingent vote election system also is similar to other ranked-vote systems. Unlike the contingent vote, other ranked-vote systems – such as single transferable voting (STV), instant-runoff voting (IRV), Coombs' method, and Baldwin's method – allow for many rounds of counting, often eliminating only one candidate, the weakest, each round. IRV is a single-winner election system that is similar to contingent voting except, unlike contingent voting, IRV may elect a candidate other than one of the two who led in the first count.

== Usage ==
A variant of the contingent vote has been used to elect the president of Sri Lanka since 1978. Under the name supplementary vote, a limited version of contingent voting was used for the elections of directly elected mayors and police and crime commissioners in England prior to 2022, and was later re-adopted, its first subsequent use being the mayoral by-election in Greater Manchester held on 30 July 2026.

In the past, the contingent vote method was used to elect the members of the Legislative Assembly of Queensland from 1892 to 1942. To date, this has been the longest continuous use of the system anywhere in the world. Contingent voting was used for Democratic party primaries in the US state of Alabama from 1915 to 1931.

== Voting and counting ==
Example of optional preferential ballot paper

In an election held using the contingent vote, the voters rank the list of candidates in order of preference. Under the most common ballot layout, they place a '1' beside their most preferred candidate, a '2' beside their second most preferred, and so on. In this respect the contingent vote is the same as other ranked-vote methods. Contingent voting entails a maximum of two rounds of counting. In the first round only first preferences are counted. Candidates receiving an absolute majority of first preferences (i.e. more than half) are immediately declared the winner, and the vote count process ends. However, if no candidate has a majority, then all but the two candidates with the most first preferences are eliminated, and the votes of the voters whose first preferences have been eliminated are transferred to whichever of the two remaining candidates they ranked the highest. Numbering one of the top-two candidates on the ballot avoids ballot exhaustion. The vote tallies of the two remaining candidates are then compared, and whichever candidate has the most (a majority) is declared elected.

== Variants ==
The supplementary vote and the Sri Lankan contingent vote are two implementation variations, in which voters cannot rank all of the candidates but rather are only permitted to express two or three preferences, respectively. This means that if a voter's marked preferences do not include either of the candidates who survive to the second round, then it will be impossible to transfer the vote, which is therefore declared "wasted" or "exhausted". Unlike the two-round system, IRV and the full-preference contingent vote, both these variants fail the Condorcet loser criterion.

=== Sri Lankan contingent vote ===
In Sri Lanka, since the 1982 presidential election, a variant of the contingent vote electoral system is used to elect the country's president. As under the conventional contingent vote, in an election held using the Sri Lankan form of the contingent vote each voter ranks the candidates in order of preference, and if no candidate receives an overall majority of first preference votes on the first count then all but the two leading candidates are eliminated and their votes redistributed to help determine a winner in a second and final round. However, whereas under the ordinary form of the contingent vote voters can rank all of the candidates in order of preference, under Sri Lankan contingent voting the voter can only express their top three preferences (which can lead to exhausted ballots). Each direct presidential election going back to the first in 1981 had seen a candidate from one of the two major parties or alliances at the time winning in the first count so the second round of vote counting had never been conducted. However, in the 2024 presidential election, the strong third-party candidacy of Anura Kumara Dissanayake, who won 42% of the first preference vote, forced a second round of counting for the first time in the nation's history. Dissanayake went on to win the election in the second round.

=== Supplementary vote ===
Example ballot designs
Two column	Single column
Each voter ranks at least one and no more than two candidates by placing an 'X' in one column to indicate their first choice of candidate and another 'X' in a second column to indicate their second choice of candidate.	A less common form is to print a single column on the ballot paper and require voters to write '1' next to their first preference and '2' next to their second. (Note: This form was used to elect the Mayor of Newham in the 2006 election.)

The supplementary vote (SV) is a variation of the contingent vote in which the voter ranks only two of the candidates in order of preference. It is used nowhere else in the world aside from some elections in England and Wales. If a voter's first-choice candidate is eliminated but their second choice is one of the two remaining candidates, their vote is transferred to the second-choice candidate. This means that the winning candidate has the support of a majority of voters who expressed a preference among the top two, although not necessarily a majority of votes cast in the first count. Unlike most other ranked choice methods, a voter must guess correctly which of the candidates will emerge in the top two for their second choice to be effective. John Curtice has said that it forces the supporters "of smaller parties to work out which of the two main candidates was most likely to appear in a runoff".

The supplementary vote has been used in all elections for combined authority and combined county authority mayors in England, except for a period between 2022 and 2026, when first-past-the-post voting (FPTP) was used. Prior to 2022, it was also used to elect the Mayor of London, the directly elected local authority mayors, and in elections for police and crime commissioners, when it was replaced by first-past-the-post.

==== History and use ====
In the early 1990s, the Plant Commission was established by the Labour Party to recommend a new voting system for the Parliament of the United Kingdom. When the Commission reported in 1993, instead of suggesting an already existing system, it recommended the supplementary vote system, which it said had never been used anywhere. Although some commentators credit the head of the commission, Raymond Plant, with the invention of SV, according to others, it was the brainchild of a Labour member of Parliament (MP) at the time, Dale Campbell-Savours, and academic Patrick Dunleavy, who outlined and advocated for it in an article for the New Statesman magazine that was published September 29, 1989.

In 2000, several districts in England introduced directly elected mayors. It was decided to use the supplementary vote for the election of these new mayors, including the Mayor of London, and for the election of police and crime commissioners across much of England and Wales. The supplementary vote was used for these offices from 2000 to 2022.

In the 2021 London election, a record 5 percent of ballots were wholly rejected, and no candidate achieved a majority of the vote. The government responded by ending the use of the supplementary vote in 2022, citing voter confusion with a complex system. However, critics, including the Labour and Green parties, argued that the wasted votes were due to ballot layout and that the change was aimed at benefitting Conservative Party candidates. They also claimed that the supplementary vote was effective in increasing multi-party participation and was popular among voters.

In July 2025, the British government published the English Devolution and Community Empowerment Bill, which – when passed in April 2026 – reverted mayoral elections, along with police and crime commissioner by-elections, back to the supplementary voting election system. The histories of two-round voting and other forms of instant run-off voting may be seen as part of the history of SV due to their similarities.

==== Impact on factions and candidates ====
The supplementary vote is said to encourage candidates to seek support beyond their core base of supporters in order to secure the second preferences of the supporters of other candidates, and so to create a more conciliatory campaigning style among candidates with similar policy platforms. SV is also likely to improve the chances of "third party" candidates by encouraging voters, who wish to do so, to vote sincerely for such candidates for whom, under systems such as first-past-the-post, they would be discouraged from doing so for tactical reasons. These positive effects are moderated by the incentives SV creates for voting, in some circumstances, for only candidates from among the leading three. Political scientists Colin Rallings and Michael Thrasher noted two flaws of SV:

- First, since the automatic dual-ballot nature of SV dispenses with any need for a runoff two weeks later – as often happens for, say, the election of the president of France – voters cast their second preferences without being certain of which candidates will make the runoff. Consequently, some second preferences will be declared invalid because they bear only preferences marked for eliminated candidates.
- Second, it is possible for the victor to fail to achieve an absolute majority overall, for it is not an obligation for a voter to cast a second preference, and even when a second preference is marked, the vote will be ineffective if it is cast for a candidate who does not make it into the top two, when the first preference is marked also for a candidate who does not make it into the second round.

== Similar systems ==
=== Two-round system ===
Under a two-round system (also known as runoff voting and the second ballot and nonpartisan primary) voters vote for only a single candidate, rather than ranking candidates in order of preference. As under the contingent vote, if no candidate has an absolute majority in the first round, all but the top two are eliminated and there is a second round. However, in the two round system, voters are asked to return and vote a second time. Because of the similarities between them, the contingent vote and the two-round system can usually be expected to elect the same winner. However, in the two-round system, the voter is permitted to change one's mind from one round to another, even if their favourite candidate in the first round has not been eliminated. It also guarantees that every voter has a chance to express a preference between the top two, unlike the limited forms of contingent vote. Voter turnout may also be higher in the second vote.

=== Top-four primary ===
The top-four primary is a variant of the nonpartisan primary which advances the top four candidates from a single primary, regardless of party, and uses instant-runoff voting in the general election to pick a majority winner.

=== Instant-runoff voting ===
As noted above, the instant-runoff voting (or alternative vote) differs from the contingent vote in that it permits several rounds rather than just two. Under the alternative vote only candidate(s) for whom it is mathematically impossible to win are eliminated after each round, and as many rounds occur as are necessary to give one candidate an absolute majority. These differences mean that the contingent vote and alternative vote can produce different results. Because, under the contingent vote, all but two candidates are eliminated in the first round, it is possible for a candidate to be eliminated who would have gone on to win had they been allowed to receive transfers in later rounds.

== See also ==
- Alternative vote plus
- History and use of instant-runoff voting
- List of democracy and elections-related topics
- Spare vote
