= NOtoAV =

2011 British political campaign

NO to AV
- The NO to AV logo
- Type: Political
- Legal status: Campaign
- Purpose: To oppose the UK switching to an Alternative Vote (AV) electoral system at the 2011 referendum
- Headquarters: London
- Region served: United Kingdom
- Official language: English
- President: Margaret Beckett
- Website: No to AV (Archived)

NOtoAV was a political campaign in the United Kingdom whose purpose was to persuade the public to vote against the Alternative Vote (AV) in the referendum on 5 May 2011. The opposition to switching to AV was successful, with the "No" vote to switching to AV receiving 67.9% of votes cast in the 2011 referendum.

== Party positions ==
=== Parties in the House of Commons ===
- Conservative Party
- Many Labour Party members. Although party leader Ed Miliband supported a 'Yes' vote, over 200 Labour MPs and Peers supported the 'No' campaign. Among the prominent Labour Party members against AV were Margaret Beckett (acting as President of the NOtoAV campaign), Caroline Flint, David Blunkett, Lord Reid of Cardowan, John Prescott and Lord Falconer of Thoroton
- Democratic Unionist Party (DUP)

=== Others ===
- Ulster Unionist Party
- British National Party
- Respect Party
- Traditional Unionist Voice
- Communist Party of Britain

== Individuals supporting NOtoAV ==
- 29 historians including David Starkey, Antony Beevor, Niall Ferguson and Alison Weir stated in a letter to The Times that they back the NOtoAV campaign.
- Ann Widdecombe
- Lord Owen
- Robert Winston
- Ross Kemp
- David Gower
- Darren Gough
- James Cracknell
- Sir Frank Williams

== Labour NotoAV ==
The Labour NotoAV campaign group was launched on 2 March 2011, with less fanfare than “Labour Yes”. Its campaign messages were similar to those of the main No campaign, with most links on its website directing to NotoAV. It seemed likely that Labour voters would decide the result of the referendum, and at that point the No campaign had more Labour members of parliament supporting it than the Yes campaign. However, opinion polls showed Labour supporters almost evenly divided.

== Campaign criticism ==
The NotoAV campaign attracted criticism in the run up to the referendum, due to its repeated claims that implementing AV would be expensive, due to the necessity of installing electronic voting machines. The claim was denied, both by the opposing campaign and the Electoral Commission and Political Studies Association. In April 2011, cabinet minister Chris Huhne threatened legal action over alleged untruths disseminated by Conservatives opposed to the alternative vote system.

At a Cabinet meeting on 2 May, Huhne was strongly critical of Conservative colleagues about the No2AV campaign material, in particular targeting a key 'No' leaflet showing a newborn baby with the slogan "She needs a maternity unit, not an alternative voting system". However, it was then revealed that this had been developed by Dan Hodges, a Labour Party campaigner working for NOtoAV.

On the day of the referendum, it was reported in the New Statesman that David Blunkett had admitted that the claim that introducing the AV system would be more expensive had been exaggerated.

== Campaign funding ==
In May 2011, three days before the referendum vote, The Guardian newspaper released an analysis of the accounts of donations to the campaign, showing that it been funded almost exclusively by Conservative Party donors. 42 of the 53 named donors to the NoToAV campaign were Conservative Party donors, having given between them £18.4 million to the Conservative Party since 2001. Nine were not identifiable from official donor records, another source was identified as official funding from the Electoral Commission, and one was a Labour Party donor, the GMB union. Among the donors to and prominent members of the Conservative Party were seven Conservative peers, including Lord Sainsbury of Preston Candover, who had donated nearly £3m to the Conservative Party since 2005. Jonathan Wood, who was the biggest shareholder in Northern Rock bank when it collapsed in 2007 and later tried to sue the then Labour government over its handling of the bank's nationalization, and Lord Fink, the Conservative Party's co-treasurer, British fund manager and former CEO and deputy chairman of the Man Group plc, have both donated £75,000 between them to the campaign in 2011. Stockbroking and corporate finance group Shore Capital donated £25,000, hedge fund Odey Asset Management Group, founded by Crispin Odey in 1991, donated £20,000; Lord Wolfson, chairman of the clothing chain Next plc gave £25,000; John Nash, co-founder of private equity firm Sovereign Capital and chairman of the healthcare company Care UK, donated £25,000. The figures obtained by the Guardian do not include donations received by the NoToAV campaign prior to the passing of the Parliamentary Voting System and Constituencies Act 2011 by Parliament in February 2011.

== See also ==
- YES! To Fairer Votes, the opposing campaign group
