= Plant Commission =

The Plant Commission was a commission in the United Kingdom that examined electoral reform started by the Labour Party while in opposition. The Commission was headed by Professor Raymond Plant and recommended a move to proportional representation as a method of electing British Members of Parliament. Plans for electoral reform were shelved by the incoming Labour government in 1997 when the party won a 179-seat majority under first past the post.

The Plant Commission recommended the supplementary vote system, which it suggested hadn't been used before (though a similar system was used in Australia in the late nineteenth century). While this has not been adopted in the UK (the option of the alternative vote was later rejected in a 2011 referendum), the Commission's secondary recommendation that European Parliament constituencies be elected by a party list system was adopted for the 1999 elections. Its further recommendation that the House of Lords be replaced by an elected second chamber has not been adopted, although the Lords was reformed in 1999 with the near-abolition of hereditary peerage.
