= John Sharkey, Baron Sharkey =

British politician (born 1947)

The Right Honourable The Lord Sharkey
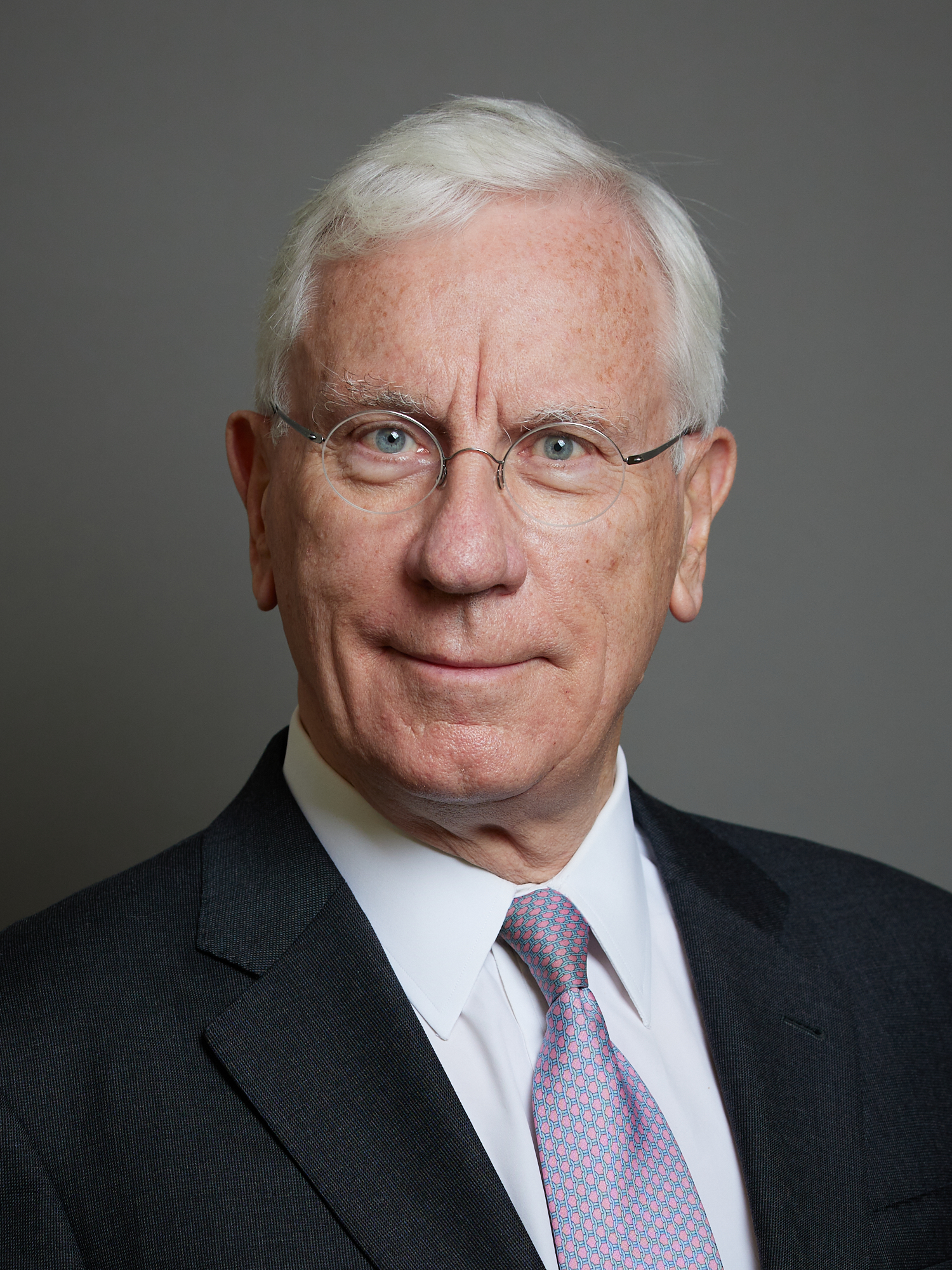

Member of the House of Lords
- Lord Temporal
- Life peerage 20 December 2010

Personal details
- Born: 24 September 1947 (age 78)
- Party: Liberal Democrats

John Kevin Sharkey, Baron Sharkey (born 24 September 1947) is a British Liberal Democrat politician. He was chairman of the Liberal Democrat General Election campaign during the 2010 United Kingdom general election and director of the YES! To Fairer Votes campaign during the 2011 United Kingdom Alternative Vote referendum. He had previously been appointed as Nick Clegg's advisor on strategic communications in January 2008.

He is also a former joint managing director of Saatchi & Saatchi UK, founder and director of Sharkey Associates Ltd. and a trustee and honorary treasurer of the Hansard Society. He was created a Life Peer as Baron Sharkey, of Niton Undercliff in the County of the Isle of Wight on 20 December 2010.

== Parliament activity ==
Lord Sharkey put forward the so-called Alan Turing law, by which men who had been convicted under legislation that outlawed homosexual acts would be pardoned.

Orders of precedence in the United Kingdom
Preceded by The Lord Dobbs	Gentlemen; Baron Sharkey	Followed by The Lord Ribeiro
