= Dan Hodges =

English newspaper columnist (born 1969)

- Born: Daniel Pearce Jackson Hodges; 7 March 1969 (age 57); Lewisham, London, England
- Occupation: Journalist
- Political party: Labour Party (1987–2013, 2015)
- Mother: Glenda Jackson

Daniel Pearce Jackson Hodges (born 7 March 1969) is an English newspaper columnist. Since March 2016, he has written a weekly column for The Mail on Sunday. Prior to this, he was a columnist for The Daily Telegraph, and in 2013 was described by James Forsyth in The Spectator as David Cameron's "new favourite columnist".

== Early life ==
Born in Lewisham, Hodges is the son of the actress and former Labour MP Glenda Jackson and her then-husband Roy Hodges, a repertory company stage-manager and actor. He was educated at Edge Hill College in Ormskirk, Lancashire, where he studied English Literature and Communications between 1987 and 1990. He worked as a parliamentary researcher for his mother between 1992 and 1997, describing it as 'straight-forward nepotism', before working in public relations for the Road Haulage Association, GMB and the Freedom To Fly lobby group. He worked briefly as Head of Communications at the London Development Agency and as Director of News for Transport for London in 2007, which he left after less than a year after mocking a contractor to the press. He subsequently led the campaign to introduce a congestion charge for Greater Manchester, which was overwhelmingly rejected in local referendums.

== Journalism ==
Hodges has worked as a journalist and blogger, writing in a freelance capacity for the New Statesman, The Daily Telegraph and The Mail on Sunday. He worked for the successful NOtoAV campaign in 2011, but attracted controversy for a provocative anti-AV poster that suggested electoral reform might lead to the deaths of newborn babies. In 2016, Hodges won the Political Commentator of the Year Award at The Comment Awards.

== Labour Party ==
Hodges supported Jon Cruddas in the 2007 deputy leadership election as a member of Compass, but has since been critical of the organisation. Hodges supported David Miliband in his unsuccessful campaign for the 2010 Labour leadership contest. Hodges describes himself as a "tribal neo-Blairite". He was a vocal critic of the former Labour Party leader Ed Miliband.

In May 2012, although he was then a long-standing member of the Labour Party, Hodges voted for the Conservative Boris Johnson in the London Mayoral elections, lauding him as a "unifying figure" over his former boss Ken Livingstone whom he saw as "divisive" and "a disgrace", adding that "London needs someone who can speak for all of London, not just the balkanized segments whose votes he craves". However, Hodges still voted for Labour London Assembly candidates.

Following the House of Commons vote on 29 August 2013 against possible military involvement in the Syrian civil war, and objecting to Ed Miliband's conduct, Hodges left the Labour Party. Hodges rejoined the Labour Party in July 2015 and supported Yvette Cooper for the Labour leadership, strongly opposing Jeremy Corbyn's candidacy. Hodges announced his resignation from the Labour Party a second time in a December 2015 op-ed for The Daily Telegraph, accusing party members of abuse and intimidation against Labour MPs.

== Other views ==
Hodges has expressed support for the government censoring whistleblowers who are spreading "information highly detrimental to the UK national interest". In early 2025, Hodges faced backlash for comments on social media concerning the war in Gaza. He asserted that no British taxpayer money should be used for reconstruction "until every Hamas terrorist is either dead or in jail". When pressed about whether the consequences for civilians, including "hundreds of thousands of children", would be that they would "go to hell", he replied: "Yes, basically." Critics accused him of endorsing collective punishment and war crimes. A British lawyer warned the comments might breach UK law, including the Public Order Act and the International Criminal Court Act 2001.

== Other work ==
Hodges is a wargame designer. His first game design was Where There Is Discord: War in the South Atlantic which is about the Falklands War. In November 2015, Hodges' first book, One Minute To Ten, was published by Penguin Books. It focuses on the three party leaders Cameron, Miliband, and Clegg, and the effect the 2015 general election had on their lives.

== Personal life ==
In February 1992, Hodges lost the sight of his left eye when trying to stop a fight in a bar. Hodges married Michelle di Leo in 2003, after meeting her at a Labour Party Conference in 1999. He lives in Blackheath with his wife and children.
