= Results of the 2011 United Kingdom Alternative Vote referendum =

United Kingdom Alternative Vote referendum
- 5 May 2011
- At present, the UK uses the "first past the post" system to elect MPs to the House of Commons. Should the "alternative vote" system be used instead?

Results
Choice	Votes	%
Yes	6,152,607	32.10%
No	13,013,123	67.90%
Valid votes	19,165,730	99.41%
Invalid or blank votes	113,292	0.59%
Total votes	19,279,022	100.00%
Registered voters/turnout	45,684,501	42.2%
- Results by local voting area No: 50–55% 55–60% 60–65% 65–70% 70–75% 75–80% Yes: 50–55% 55–60% 60–65%

On 5 May 2011, the United Kingdom held a referendum on whether to change the system for electing members to the House of Commons, the lower house of the national Parliament at Westminster. In the event of a "Yes" vote, future general elections would use the "alternative vote"; in the event of a "No" vote, the existing first-past-the-post system would remain in place. The votes cast in the referendum were first counted in each of 440 districts or electoral divisions across the country (the "local counting areas"), which were then combined and declared at a regional level (the regions being the constituent countries of Wales, Scotland and Northern Ireland, and the regions of England).

Under the provisions of the Parliamentary Voting System and Constituencies Act 2011 there was a total of 440 voting areas across twelve regions using the same boundaries as used in European Parliamentary elections since 1999 under the provisions of the European Parliamentary Elections Act 2002 with the exception of Gibraltar which did not participate in the referendum. In England the 326 local government districts were used as the voting areas; these consist of all unitary authorities, all metropolitan boroughs, all shire districts, the London boroughs, the City of London and the Isles of Scilly. As the date of the plebiscite coincided with elections to the Scottish Parliament, Welsh Assembly and the Northern Ireland Assembly different arrangements were required for the devolved nations so in Scotland the 73 Scottish Parliamentary constituencies were used as the Scottish counting areas and in Wales the 40 Welsh assembly constituencies were used as the Welsh counting areas and Northern Ireland was a single counting area.

Ballots were due to be verified by 13:00 BST on 6 May 2011 and the votes were counted from 16:00 BST onwards. Both the local and regional results were updated live online via aboutmyvote.co.uk, a publicly accessible website run by the Electoral Commission.

This article lists, by voting area, all the results of the referendum, each ordered into national and regional sections.

== United Kingdom ==
The national result for the whole United Kingdom was announced at the Platinum Suite at the Exhibition Centre London (ExCel) by the Chief counting officer (CCO) and Chair of the Electoral Commission, Jenny Watson, at 01:00 BST on Saturday 7 May 2011 after all 440 voting areas and UK regions had declared their results. With a national turnout of 42% the target to secure the majority win for the winning side was 9,639,512 votes. The decision by the people who voted was a decisive "No" vote to adopting the alternative vote system in future United Kingdom general elections by a majority of 6,860,516 votes over those who had voted "Yes" in favor of the proposal.

2011 United Kingdom Alternative Vote referendum
Choice	Votes	%
Yes	6,152,607	32.10
No	13,013,123	67.90
Total	19,165,730	100.00
Valid votes	19,165,730	99.41
Invalid/blank votes	113,292	0.59
Total votes	19,279,022	100.00
Registered voters/turnout	45,684,501	42.20
Source: Electoral Commission

National referendum results (excluding invalid votes)
Yes; 6,152,607 (32.1%)	No; 13,013,123 (67.9%)
▲50%

=== Results by United Kingdom regions ===
Results by regions and countries

"Yes" votes percentages

Region	Electorate	Voter turnout, of eligible	Votes		Proportion of votes		Invalid votes	Highest Yes vote	Highest No vote
Region	Electorate	Voter turnout, of eligible	Yes	No	Yes	No	Invalid votes	Highest Yes vote	Highest No vote
East Midlands	3,348,469	42.8%	408,877	1,013,864	28.74%	71.26%	9,486	Leicester 42.85%	South Holland 78.57%
East of England	4,263,006	43.1%	530,140	1,298,004	29.00%	71.00%	11,218	Cambridge 54.32%	Castle Point 79.71%
Greater London	5,258,802	35.4%	734,427	1,123,480	39.53%	60.47%	4,561	Hackney 60.68%	Havering 77.30%
North East England	1,968,137	38.8%	212,951	546,138	28.05%	71.95%	3,214	Newcastle upon Tyne 35.85%	Hartlepool 76.95%
North West England	5,239,323	39.1%	613,249	1,416,201	30.22%	69.78%	19,273	Manchester 44.47%	Wyre 76.69%
Northern Ireland	1,198,966	55.8%	289,088	372,706	43.68%	56.32%	7,062	One voting area	One voting area
Scotland	3,893,268	50.7%	713,813	1,249,375	36.36%	63.64%	12,370	Glasgow Kelvin 58.78%	Banffshire and Buchan Coast 70.93%
South East England	6,288,366	43.1%	823,793	1,951,793	29.68%	70.32%	12,594	Oxford 54.11%	Havant 77.02%
South West England	4,028,829	44.6%	564,541	1,225,305	31.54%	68.46%	7,399	Bristol 44.68%	East Dorset 76.89%
Wales	2,268,739	41.7%	325,349	616,307	34.55%	65.45%	5,267	Cardiff Central 45.68%	Clwyd West 69.78%
West Midlands	4,093,521	39.8%	461,847	1,157,772	28.52%	71.48%	13,845	Birmingham 35.71%	South Staffordshire 79.07%
Yorkshire and the Humber	3,835,075	39.9%	474,532	1,042,178	31.29%	68.71%	13,722	Sheffield 38.28%	North East Lincolnshire 75.54%

=== Results by United Kingdom constituent countries ===
Results solely by country

"Yes" votes %

Country	Electorate	Voter turnout, of eligible	Votes		Proportion of votes		Invalid votes
Country	Electorate	Voter turnout, of eligible	Yes	No	Yes	No	Invalid votes
England	38,323,528	40.7%	4,786,532	10,724,067	30.86%	69.14%	95,322
Northern Ireland	1,198,966	55.8%	289,088	372,306	43.68%	56.32%	7,062
Scotland	3,893,269	50.7%	713,813	1,249,375	36.36%	63.64%	12,370
Wales	2,268,739	41.7%	325,349	616,307	34.55%	65.45%	5,267

=== Local results ===
Of the 440 voting areas, ten returned a majority in favour of the change (Cambridge, Oxford, Glasgow Kelvin, Edinburgh Central, and the London Boroughs of Hackney, Islington, Haringey, Lambeth, Southwark and Camden). The counting area with the highest proportion of AV supporters was the London Borough of Hackney with 60.68% in favour of the change (34.23% turnout) and the lowest proportion was the borough of Castle Point, Essex with 20.29% in favour (41.38% turnout).

== England ==
The English local districts were used as the voting areas for the referendum in England; these consist of all unitary authorities, all metropolitan boroughs, all shire districts, the London boroughs, the City of London and the Isles of Scilly.

The English Regions were also then used to count the votes at the regional level meaning there was no single national count of the votes. All nine regions in England returned huge "No" votes.

2011 United Kingdom Alternative Vote referendum (England)
Choice	Votes	%
Yes	4,786,352	30.86
No	10,724,067	69.14
Total	15,510,419	100.00
Valid votes	5,510,419	98.30
Invalid/blank votes	95,322	1.70
Total votes	5,605,741	100.00
Registered voters/turnout	38,323,528	14.63

England referendum results (excluding invalid votes)
Yes; 4,786,352 (30.9%)	No; 10,724,067 (69.1%)
▲50%

=== East Midlands ===
Results in the East Midlands Results by local voting area: No: 50–55%; 55–60%; 60–65%; 65–70%; 70–75%; 75–80%; Yes: 50–55%; 55–60%; 60–65%

2011 United Kingdom Alternative Vote referendum (East Midlands)
Choice	Votes	%
Yes	408,877	28.74
No	1,013,864	71.26
Total	1,422,741	100.00
Valid votes	1,432,237	99.34
Invalid/blank votes	9,496	0.66
Total votes	1,441,733	100.00
Registered voters/turnout	3,348,469	43.06

East Midlands referendum results (excluding invalid votes)
Yes; 408,877 (28.7%)	No; 1,013,864 (71.3%)
▲50%

The East Midlands region was broken down into 40 voting areas.

Counting Area	Turnout %	No votes	Yes votes	No %	Yes %
Amber Valley	43.86	29,745	12,432	70.52	29.48
Ashfield	38.87	25,693	9,149	73.74	26.26
Bassetlaw	41.72	26,441	8,757	75.12	24.88
Blaby	41.97	22,388	7,862	74.01	25.99
Bolsover	39.76	16,815	5,890	74.06	25.94
Boston	39.58	13,337	3,958	77.11	22.89
Broxtowe	48.36	27,840	12,703	68.67	31.33
Charnwood	42.52	28,902	16,114	70.71	29.29
Chesterfield	42.87	24,190	10,335	70.07	29.93
Corby	43.01	12,933	5,078	71.81	28.19
Daventry	45.95	20,305	6,699	75.19	24.81
Derby	39.50	47,622	20,502	69.90	30.10
Derbyshire Dales	52.22	20,893	8,795	70.38	29.62
East Lindsey	42.60	34,045	10,571	76.31	23.69
East Northamptonshire	43.85	21,596	6,935	75.69	24.31
Erewash	43.04	26,863	9,255	74.38	25.62
Gedling	44.90	27,745	11,089	71.45	28.55
High Peak	44.40	21,569	10,443	67.38	32.62
Harborough	48.23	23,577	8,156	74.30	25.70
Hinckley and Bosworth	44.10	26,771	9,642	73.52	26.48
Kettering	42.90	22,174	7,500	74.73	25.27
Leicester	41.79	50,678	38,005	57.15	42.85
Lincoln	36.68	16,099	6,951	69.84	30.16
Mansfield	38.09	21,610	8,474	71.83	28.17
Melton	44.69	12,563	4,590	73.24	26.76
Newark and Sherwood	45.05	27,621	10,211	73.01	26.99
North East Derbyshire	42.82	24,576	8,624	74.02	25.98
Northampton	39.68	41,065	17,651	69.94	30.06
North Kesteven	42.95	27,397	7,926	77.56	22.44
North West Leicestershire	45.46	24,780	7,575	76.59	23.41
Nottingham	35.76	42,853	25,564	62.64	37.36
Oadby and Wigston	43.25	13,523	5,600	70.72	29.28
Rushcliffe	51.80	29,739	14,083	67.86	32.14
Rutland	49.27	10,048	3,809	72.51	27.49
South Derbyshire	43.57	23,323	7,463	75.76	24.24
South Holland	39.83	20,542	5,603	78.57	21.43
South Kesteven	42.63	32,217	11,247	74.12	25.88
South Northamptonshire	48.01	22,860	9,064	71.61	28.39
Wellingborough	45.70	18,044	6,349	73.97	26.03
West Lindsey	43.70	22,882	8,223	73.56	26.44

=== East of England ===
Results in the East of England Results by local voting area: No: 50–55%; 55–60%; 60–65%; 65–70%; 70–75%; 75–80%; Yes: 50–55%; 55–60%; 60–65%

2011 United Kingdom Alternative Vote referendum (East of England)
Choice	Votes	%
Yes	520,140	22.14
No	1,829,362	77.86
Total	2,349,502	100.00
Valid votes	1,828,144	99.39
Invalid/blank votes	11,218	0.61
Total votes	1,839,362	100.00
Registered voters/turnout	4,263,006	43.15

East of England referendum results (excluding invalid votes)
Yes; 530,140 (29%)	No; 1,298,004 (71%)
▲50%

The East of England region was broken down into 47 voting areas.

Counting Area	Turnout %	No votes	Yes votes	No %	Yes %
Babergh	43.46	20,332	9,696	67.71	32.29
Basildon	35.11	34,097	10,461	76.52	23.48
Bedford	47.04	36,421	16,184	69.23	30.77
Braintree	42.96	34,788	11,501	75.15	24.85
Breckland	42.33	29,920	9,793	75.34	24.66
Brentwood	46.29	19,381	6,177	75.83	24.17
Broadland	46.88	32,607	12,073	72.98	27.02
Broxbourne	36.33	19,386	4,988	79.54	20.46
Cambridge	48.43	17,871	21,253	45.68	54.32
Castle Point	41.38	21,012	5,348	79.71	20.29
Central Bedfordshire	42.02	58,496	21,774	72.87	27.13
Chelmsford	44.42	39,829	15,934	71.43	28.57
Colchester	42.11	34,293	17,809	65.82	34.18
Dacorum	44.96	33,295	14,438	69.75	30.25
East Cambridgeshire	43.93	18,365	8,262	68.97	31.03
East Hertfordshire	45.24	33,478	12,716	72.47	27.53
Epping Forest	38.39	28,240	8,533	76.80	23.20
Fenland	38.83	21,087	6,336	76.90	23.10
Forest Heath	37.71	10,757	3,327	76.38	23.62
Great Yarmouth	36.58	19,207	6,325	75.23	24.77
Harlow	37.36	16,226	5,823	73.59	26.41
Hertsmere	39.95	22,005	6,772	76.47	23.53
Huntingdonshire	44.45	38,725	15,145	71.89	28.11
Ipswich	39.24	25,195	10,859	69.88	30.12
King's Lynn and West Norfolk	42.58	35,996	11,652	75.55	24.45
Luton	39.45	34,980	16,002	68.61	31.39
Maldon	43.20	15,735	4,987	75.93	24.07
Mid Suffolk	47.95	25,828	10,177	71.73	28.27
North Hertfordshire	45.94	30,410	13,592	69.11	30.89
North Norfolk	50.09	28,555	11,799	70.76	29.24
Norwich	40.88	21,582	18,231	54.52	45.48
Peterborough	41.18	32,878	15,534	67.91	32.09
Rochford	40.89	20,931	5,542	79.07	20.93
South Cambridgeshire	49.29	34,594	18,351	65.34	34.66
Southend-on-Sea	38.33	34,365	13,488	71.81	28.19
South Norfolk	47.23	32,400	13,332	70.85	29.15
St Albans	51.90	33,443	18,934	63.85	36.15
St Edmundsbury	42.68	24,607	9,789	71.54	28.46
Stevenage	41.64	17,927	7,311	71.03	28.97
Suffolk Coastal	49.77	33,524	13,452	71.36	28.64
Tendring	43.89	33,363	13,627	71.00	29.00
Three Rivers	44.14	20,779	7,985	72.24	27.76
Thurrock	34.59	28,284	9,307	75.24	24.76
Uttlesford	49.19	21,595	7,624	73.91	26.09
Watford	41.69	16,814	9,259	64.49	35.51
Waveney	43.11	28,162	10,035	73.73	26.27
Welwyn Hatfield	42.74	23,482	8,876	72.57	27.43

=== Greater London ===
Results in London Results by local voting area: No: 50–55%; 55–60%; 60–65%; 65–70%; 70–75%; 75–80%; Yes: 50–55%; 55–60%; 60–65%

2011 United Kingdom Alternative Vote referendum (Greater London)
Choice	Votes	%
Yes	734,427	39.53
No	1,123,480	60.47
Total	1,857,907	100.00
Valid votes	1,857,907	99.76
Invalid/blank votes	4,561	0.24
Total votes	1,862,468	100.00
Registered voters/turnout	5,257,802	35.42

Greater London referendum results (excluding invalid votes)
Yes; 734,427 (39.5%)	No; 1,123,470 (60.5%)
▲50%

The London region was broken down into 33 voting areas.

Counting Area	Turnout %	No votes	Yes votes	No %	Yes %
Barking and Dagenham	27.77	22,338	9,436	70.30	29.70
Barnet	38.91	55,451	30,153	64.78	35.22
Bexley	37.48	48,630	14,929	76.51	23.49
Brent	29.68	30,941	25,551	54.77	45.23
Bromley	41.28	67,671	27,286	71.26	28.74
Camden	37.41	24,845	26,275	48.60	51.40
City of London	42.65	1,384	1,196	53.64	46.36
City of Westminster	31.53	24,805	15,279	61.88	38.12
Croydon	35.90	58,475	28,789	67.01	32.99
Ealing	36.21	42,565	32,445	56.75	43.25
Enfield	35.43	45,721	23,521	66.03	33.97
Greenwich	33.26	32,039	20,618	60.84	39.16
Hackney	34.23	20,064	30,969	39.32	60.68
Haringey	35.70	23,223	30,310	43.38	56.62
Harrow	37.94	40,993	20,990	66.14	33.86
Hammersmith and Fulham	37.85	24,380	16,889	59.08	40.92
Havering	35.92	49,691	14,592	77.30	22.70
Hillingdon	34.10	45,535	18,888	70.68	29.32
Hounslow	32.83	32,550	20,953	60.84	39.16
Islington	35.80	20,851	27,553	43.08	56.92
Kensington and Chelsea	34.40	20,332	9,696	67.71	32.29
Kingston upon Thames	42.81	27,945	18,230	60.52	39.48
Lambeth	33.16	28,758	34,712	45.31	54.69
Lewisham	33.20	28,929	28,184	50.65	49.35
Merton	39.83	33,573	18,375	64.63	35.37
Newham	27.16	27,169	21,085	56.30	43.70
Redbridge	32.92	42,717	20,524	67.55	32.45
Richmond upon Thames	47.15	35,768	24,796	59.06	40.94
Southwark	34.43	29,304	32,695	47.27	52.73
Sutton	38.90	35,003	16,930	67.40	32.60
Tower Hamlets	28.86	23,975	20,286	54.17	45.83
Waltham Forest	33.83	31,118	22,140	58.43	41.57
Wandsworth	37.07	46,737	30,152	60.79	39.21

=== North East England ===
Results in North East England Results by local voting area: No: 50–55%; 55–60%; 60–65%; 65–70%; 70–75%; 75–80%; Yes: 50–55%; 55–60%; 60–65%

2011 United Kingdom Alternative Vote referendum (North East England)
Choice	Votes	%
Yes	212,951	28.05
No	546,138	71.95
Total	759,089	100.00
Valid votes	759,089	99.58
Invalid/blank votes	3,214	0.42
Total votes	762,303	100.00
Registered voters/turnout	1,968,137	38.73

North East England referendum results (excluding invalid votes)
Yes; 212,951 (28.1%)	No; 546,138 (71.9%)
▲50%

The North East England region was broken down into 12 voting areas.

Counting Area	Turnout %	No votes	Yes votes	No %	Yes %
Darlington	41.47	23,096	9,134	71.66	28.34
Durham	34.95	100,203	40,435	71.25	28.75
Gateshead	41.28	44,366	16,214	73.24	26.76
Hartlepool	31.45	16,685	4,998	76.95	23.05
Middlesbrough	35.69	25,721	10,416	71.18	28.82
Newcastle upon Tyne	40.93	51,484	28,766	64.15	35.85
North Tyneside	41.82	48,078	16,296	74.69	25.31
Northumberland	40.78	72,500	27,252	72.68	27.32
Redcar and Cleveland	41.41	31,859	11,554	73.39	26.61
South Tyneside	39.13	31,991	12,533	71.85	28.15
Stockton-on-Tees	38.71	40,763	13,877	74.60	25.40
Sunderland	37.64	59,392	21,476	73.44	26.56

=== North West England ===
Results in North West England Results by local voting area: No: 50–55%; 55–60%; 60–65%; 65–70%; 70–75%; 75–80%; Yes: 50–55%; 55–60%; 60–65%

2011 United Kingdom Alternative Vote referendum (North West England)
Choice	Votes	%
Yes	613,249	30.22
No	1,416,201	69.78
Total	2,029,450	100.00
Valid votes	2,029,450	99.06
Invalid/blank votes	19,273	0.94
Total votes	2,048,723	100.00
Registered voters/turnout	5,239,323	39.10

North West England referendum results (excluding invalid votes)
Yes; 613,249 (30.2%)	No; 1,416,201 (69.8%)
▲50%

The North West England region was broken down into 39 voting areas.

Counting Area	Turnout %	No votes	Yes votes	No %	Yes %
Allerdale	45.25	24,533	8,354	74.60	25.40
Barrow-in-Furness	36.00	14,383	4,561	75.92	24.08
Blackburn with Darwen	43.26	29,787	11,393	72.33	27.67
Blackpool	36.88	30,343	10,544	74.21	25.79
Bolton	38.09	53,037	20,825	71.81	28.19
Burnley	38.84	18,822	7,037	72.79	27.21
Bury	40.28	41,878	15,625	72.83	27.17
Carlisle	39.72	22,611	10,202	68.91	31.09
Cheshire East	43.04	88,669	33,241	72.73	27.27
Cheshire West and Chester	43.11	78,450	30,322	72.12	27.88
Chorley	42.39	25,119	8,598	74.50	25.50
Copeland	41.07	16,907	5,628	75.03	24.97
Eden	45.07	13,302	5,342	71.35	28.65
Fylde	44.62	20,727	6,413	76.37	23.63
Halton	34.18	22,432	8,763	71.91	28.09
Hyndburn	40.35	17,891	6,167	74.37	25.63
Knowsley	33.05	24,859	11,343	68.67	31.33
Lancaster	39.09	28,555	13,504	67.89	32.11
Liverpool	35.92	71,739	41,035	63.61	36.39
Manchester	32.04	60,495	48,442	55.53	44.47
Oldham	38.60	42,623	17,076	71.40	28.60
Pendle	43.69	21,565	7,077	75.29	24.71
Preston	38.44	25,218	11,413	68.84	31.16
Ribble Valley	44.93	15,138	4,982	75.24	24.76
Rochdale	36.30	40,146	16,390	71.01	28.99
Rossendale	38.17	14,480	5,361	72.98	27.02
Salford	33.15	37,373	16,601	69.24	30.76
Sefton	39.22	57,289	23,925	70.54	29.46
South Lakeland	50.28	27,781	13,412	67.44	32.56
South Ribble	40.16	25,582	8,845	74.31	25.69
St Helens	37.96	36,753	14,682	71.46	28.54
Stockport	41.64	59,937	29,930	66.70	33.30
Tameside	36.00	43,187	16,516	72.34	27.66
Trafford	42.73	48,602	22,687	68.18	31.82
Warrington	39.39	40,442	19,134	67.88	32.12
West Lancashire	39.83	24,804	9,288	72.76	27.24
Wigan	33.55	48,793	31,201	61.00	39.00
Wirral	43.16	73,120	28,627	71.86	28.14
Wyre	44.26	28,829	8,763	76.69	23.31

=== South East England ===
Results in South East England Results by local voting area: No: 50–55%; 55–60%; 60–65%; 65–70%; 70–75%; 75–80%; Yes: 50–55%; 55–60%; 60–65%

2011 United Kingdom Alternative Vote referendum (South East England)
Choice	Votes	%
Yes	823,793	29.68
No	1,951,793	70.32
Total	2,775,586	100.00
Valid votes	2,775,586	99.55
Invalid/blank votes	12,594	0.45
Total votes	2,788,180	100.00
Registered voters/turnout	6,288,366	44.34

South East England referendum results (excluding invalid votes)
Yes; 823,793 (29.7%)	No; 1,951,793 (70.3%)
▲50%

The South East England region was broken down into 67 voting areas.

Counting Area	Turnout %	No votes	Yes votes	No %	Yes %
Adur	39.84	13,412	5,357	71.46	28.54
Arun	44.70	37,536	11,729	76.19	23.81
Ashford	45.02	28,132	10,349	73.11	26.89
Aylesbury Vale	45.74	41,096	17,777	69.80	30.20
Basingstoke and Deane	43.60	38,681	14,837	72.28	27.72
Bracknell Forest	41.20	24,001	9,677	71.27	28.73
Brighton and Hove	45.18	44.198	43,948	50.14	49.86
Canterbury	44.43	30,759	15,398	66.64	33.36
Cherwell	43.53	30,925	12,944	70.49	29.51
Chichester	46.44	30,549	10,856	73.78	26.22
Chiltern	51.67	27,331	8,933	75.37	24.63
Crawley	39.41	20,275	7,993	71.72	28.28
Dartford	41.43	21,397	7,256	74.68	25.32
Dover	45.23	27,386	9,897	73.45	26.55
Eastbourne	44.63	21,920	9,565	69.62	30.38
East Hampshire	48.30	31,550	11,259	73.70	26.30
Eastleigh	44.05	28,644	12,796	69.12	30.88
Elmbridge	43.92	30,930	11,200	73.42	26.58
Epsom and Ewell	46.11	17,741	7,240	71.02	28.98
Fareham	45.36	29,874	9,825	75.25	24.75
Gosport	37.71	17,546	5,321	76.73	23.27
Gravesham	43.59	22,023	8,266	72.71	27.29
Guildford	48.37	33,351	14,982	69.00	31.00
Hart	46.56	21,873	9,817	69.02	30.98
Hastings	36.78	15,277	7,349	67.52	32.48
Havant	38.91	27,614	8,241	77.02	22.98
Horsham	47.94	33,878	15,039	69.26	30.74
Isle of Wight	40.07	32,841	11,311	74.38	25.62
Lewes	49.18	23,738	12,531	65.45	34.55
Maidstone	42.39	35,133	12,214	74.19	25.81
Medway	39.76	54,540	18,817	74.35	25.65
Mid Sussex	47.88	33,704	15,659	68.28	31.72
Milton Keynes	41.23	46,646	21,773	68.18	31.82
Mole Valley	53.02	24,748	9,541	72.17	27.83
New Forest	44.78	47,732	16,135	74.74	25.26
Oxford	37.90	18,395	21,693	45.89	54.11
Portsmouth	35.96	34,490	16,577	67.54	34.46
Reading	41.20	27,571	17,605	61.03	38.97
Reigate and Banstead	43.25	30,827	11,891	72.16	27.84
Rother	48.24	25,167	8,718	74.27	25.73
Runnymede	39.88	16,901	6,297	72.86	27.14
Rushmoor	38.98	17,596	7,417	70.35	29.65
Sevenoaks	46.32	29,850	9,849	75.19	24.81
Shepway	42.03	24,342	8,920	73.18	26.82
Slough	37.61	19,397	11,956	61.87	38.13
South Bucks	42.86	16,503	5,001	76.74	23.26
South Oxfordshire	48.61	33,565	14,776	69.43	30.57
Southampton	38.06	39,257	23,062	62.99	37.01
Spelthorne	42.07	21,873	7,687	74.00	26.00
Surrey Heath	45.91	21,725	7,116	75.33	24.67
Swale	40.72	28,948	9,634	75.03	24.97
Tandridge	47.63	20,572	8,286	71.29	28.71
Test Valley	48.10	29,296	13,862	67.88	32.12
Thanet	42.17	28,613	10,168	73.78	26.22
Tonbridge and Malling	45.07	29,700	9,880	75.04	24.96
Tunbridge Wells	46.01	25,469	10,892	70.04	29.96
Vale of White Horse	49.16	30,507	14,737	67.43	32.57
Waverley	51.76	33,723	12,718	72.61	27.39
Wealden	47.97	40,667	14,275	74.02	25.98
West Berkshire	48.69	39,235	15,637	71.50	28.50
West Oxfordshire	48.25	26,739	10,766	71.29	28.71
Winchester	54.04	32,857	15,005	68.65	31.35
Windsor and Maidenhead	48.52	35,835	12,767	73.73	26.27
Woking	49.10	23,391	10,424	69.17	30.83
Wokingham	47.32	39,232	15,968	71.07	28.93
Worthing	39.82	21,653	9,476	69.56	30.44
Wycombe	46.23	38,872	16,965	69.62	30.38

=== South West England ===
Results in South West England Results by local voting area: No: 50–55%; 55–60%; 60–65%; 65–70%; 70–75%; 75–80%; Yes: 50–55%; 55–60%; 60–65%

2011 United Kingdom Alternative Vote referendum (South West England)
Choice	Votes	%
Yes	564,541	31.54
No	1,225,305	68.46
Total	1,789,846	100.00
Valid votes	1,789,846	99.59
Invalid/blank votes	7,399	0.41
Total votes	1,797,245	100.00
Registered voters/turnout	4,028,829	44.61

South West England referendum results (excluding invalid votes)
Yes; 564,541 (31.5%)	No; 1,225,305 (68.5%)
▲50%

The South West England region was broken down into 37 voting areas.

Counting Area	Turnout %	No votes	Yes votes	No %	Yes %
Bath and North East Somerset	48.94	40,471	25,042	61.78	38.22
Bournemouth	36.19	33,468	14,030	70.46	29.54
Bristol	41.68	69,878	56,433	55.32	44.68
Cheltenham	41.38	22,695	12,972	63.63	36.37
Christchurch	49.66	14,729	4,492	76.63	23.37
Cornwall	40.20	117,770	51,184	69.71	30.29
Cotswold	41.38	22,695	12,972	63.63	36.37
East Devon	50.07	36,605	14,778	71.24	28.76
East Dorset	49.33	26,688	8,020	76.89	23.11
Exeter	43.64	22,605	14,432	61.03	38.97
Forest of Dean	45.72	20,758	8,727	70.40	29.60
Gloucester	39.69	24,730	9,964	71.28	28.72
Isles of Scilly	47.96	542	288	65.30	34.70
Mendip	49.87	27,162	14,419	65.32	34.68
Mid Devon	47.59	19,349	8,737	68.89	31.11
North Dorset	49.29	18,371	7,342	71.45	28.55
North Devon	49.29	18,371	7,342	71.45	28.55
North Somerset	46.07	49,101	22,473	68.60	31.40
Plymouth	38.88	49,743	20,251	71.07	28.93
Poole	42.77	34,655	13,367	72.16	27.84
Purbeck	48.96	12,741	4,979	71.90	28.10
Sedgemoor	41.89	25,549	11,221	69.48	30.52
South Gloucestershire	46.17	64,993	27,179	71.51	29.49
South Hams	51.23	23,241	11,343	67.20	32.80
South Somerset	48.69	42,239	18,489	69.55	30.45
Stroud	48.99	28,376	15,154	65.19	34.81
Swindon	39.20	41,286	17,803	69.87	30.13
Taunton Deane	46.92	26,339	12,380	68.03	31.97
Teignbridge	47.83	33,016	14,994	68.77	31.23
Tewkesbury	45.75	21,291	8,052	72.56	27.44
Torbay	41.52	30,428	12,156	71.45	28.55
Torridge	45.81	16,363	7,030	69.95	30.05
West Dorset	53.28	28,391	13,688	67.47	32.53
West Devon	51.03	14,805	6,713	68.80	31.20
West Somerset	50.71	10,503	3,671	74.10	25.90
Wiltshire	43.30	14,961	7,048	67.98	32.02
Weymouth and Portland	43.30	14,961	7,048	67.98	32.02

=== West Midlands ===
Results in the West Midlands Results by local voting area: No: 50–55%; 55–60%; 60–65%; 65–70%; 70–75%; 75–80%; Yes: 50–55%; 55–60%; 60–65%

2011 United Kingdom Alternative Vote referendum (West Midlands)
Choice	Votes	%
Yes	461,772	28.51
No	1,157,772	71.49
Total	1,619,544	100.00
Valid votes	1,619,619	99.15
Invalid/blank votes	13,845	0.85
Total votes	1,633,464	100.00
Registered voters/turnout	4,093,521	39.90

West Midlands referendum results (excluding invalid votes)
Yes; 461,772 (28.5%)	No; 1,157,772 (71.5%)
▲50%

The West Midlands region was broken down into 30 voting areas.

Counting Area	Turnout %	No votes	Yes votes	No %	Yes %
Birmingham	36.58	170,749	94,835	64.29	35.71
Bromsgrove	44.73	24,118	8,432	74.10	25.90
Cannock Chase	33.06	19,151	5,621	77.31	22.69
Coventry	37.77	56,037	27,629	66.98	33.02
Dudley	38.38	70,064	21,681	76.37	23.63
East Staffordshire	43.83	27,155	9,129	74.84	25.16
Herefordshire	46.24	44,448	18,665	70.43	29.57
Lichfield	42.70	25,572	7,938	76.31	23.69
Malvern Hills	47.76	19,617	8,368	70.10	29.90
Newcastle-under-Lyme	36.18	25,644	9,473	73.02	26.98
North Warwickshire	43.82	16,509	4,918	77.05	22.95
Nuneaton and Bedworth	36.14	24,021	9,809	71.01	28.99
Redditch	37.80	17,547	6,385	73.32	26.68
Rugby	45.02	23,574	8,733	72.97	27.03
Sandwell	35.13	54,355	21,738	71.43	28.57
Shropshire	42.15	68,732	27,221	71.63	28.37
Solihull	41.25	50,298	1,577	76.12	23.88
South Staffordshire	41.27	27,769	7,349	79.07	20.93
Stafford	46.23	32,937	11,711	73.77	26.23
Staffordshire Moorlands	41.81	24,504	7,749	75.97	24.03
Stoke-on-Trent	31.18	41,277	15,814	72.30	27.70
Stratford-on-Avon	50.06	34,766	11,982	74.37	25.63
Tamworth	36.97	16,449	4,829	77.31	22.69
Telford and Wrekin	43.05	36,213	14,097	71.98	28.02
Walsall	37.87	52,641	18,437	74.06	25.94
Warwick	50.31	32,210	16,371	66.30	33.70
Wolverhampton	38.29	46,507	18,352	71.70	28.30
Worcester	40.73	20,083	9,525	67.83	32.17
Wychavon	48.15	31,916	11,168	74.08	25.92
Wyre Forest	36.88	22,909	8,110	73.85	26.15

=== Yorkshire and the Humber ===
Results in Yorkshire and the Humber Results by local voting area: No: 50–55%; 55–60%; 60–65%; 65–70%; 70–75%; 75–80%; Yes: 50–55%; 55–60%; 60–65%

2011 United Kingdom Alternative Vote referendum (Yorkshire and the Humber)
Choice	Votes	%
Yes	474,532	31.29
No	1,042,168	68.71
Total	1,516,700	100.00
Valid votes	1,516,710	99.10
Invalid/blank votes	13,722	0.90
Total votes	1,530,432	100.00
Registered voters/turnout	3,835,075	39.91

Yorkshire and the Humber referendum results (excluding invalid votes)
Yes; 474,532 (31.3%)	No; 1,042,178 (68.7%)
▲50%

The Yorkshire and the Humber region was broken down into 21 voting areas.

Counting Area	Turnout %	No votes	Yes votes	No %	Yes %
Barnsley	35.81	46,335	15,868	74.49	25.51
Bradford	40.50	87,838	42,858	67.21	32.79
Calderdale	41.12	41,175	18,494	69.01	30.99
Craven	46.84	14,527	6,091	70.46	29.54
Doncaster	36.80	58,726	21,179	73.49	26.51
East Riding of Yorkshire	42.18	82,929	29,358	73.85	26.15
Hambleton	46.10	20,991	11,281	65.04	34.96
Harrogate	46.55	37,998	16,179	70.14	29.86
Kingston upon Hull	31.91	39,554	17,475	69.36	30.64
Kirklees	42.46	85,395	42,270	66.89	33.11
Leeds	39.06	136,632	71,506	65.64	34.36
North East Lincolnshire	34.23	29,484	9,549	75.54	24.46
North Lincolnshire	39.57	36,031	12,542	74.18	25.82
Richmondshire	46.94	12,002	4,088	74.59	25.41
Rotherham	38.88	51,996	21,613	70.64	29.36
Ryedale	45.58	13,987	5,042	73.50	26.50
Scarborough	39.86	23,440	10,148	69.79	30.21
Selby	44.15	20,907	7,094	74.67	25.33
Sheffield	41.64	98,563	61,141	61.72	38.28
Wakefield	35.50	62,531	25,766	70.81	29.19
York	44.28	41,137	24,980	62.22	37.78

== Northern Ireland ==
Northern Ireland was a single voting area, as well as being a regional count for the referendum. It was the last region of the United Kingdom to declare its result after major delays due to slow pace of counting and declaring results for the 2011 Northern Ireland Assembly Elections meant that the start of the local count for the referendum could not begin until the evening on Friday 6 May 2011, several hours after counting had started in the rest of the country and the result was not finally known until 1am on Saturday 7 May 2011.

2011 United Kingdom Alternative Vote referendum (Northern Ireland)
Choice	Votes	%
Yes	289,306	43.73
No	372,306	56.27
Total	661,612	100.00
Valid votes	661,794	98.94
Invalid/blank votes	7,062	1.06
Total votes	668,856	100.00
Registered voters/turnout	1,198,966	55.79

Northern Ireland referendum results (excluding invalid votes)
Yes; 289,088 (43.7%)	No; 372,306 (56.3%)
▲50%

== Scotland ==
Results in Scotland Results by local voting area: No: 50–55%; 55–60%; 60–65%; 65–70%; 70–75%; 75–80%; Yes: 50–55%; 55–60%; 60–65%

The constituencies of the Scottish Parliament were used as the local voting areas for the referendum throughout Scotland.

2011 United Kingdom Alternative Vote referendum (Scotland)
Choice	Votes	%
Yes	713,813	36.36
No	1,249,375	63.64
Total	1,963,188	100.00
Valid votes	1,963,188	99.37
Invalid/blank votes	12,370	0.63
Total votes	1,975,558	100.00
Registered voters/turnout	3,893,268	50.74

Scotland referendum results (excluding invalid votes)
Yes; 713,813 (36.4%)	No; 1,249,375 (63.6%)
▲50%

Scotland was broken down into 73 voting areas.

Counting Area	Turnout %	No votes	Yes votes	No %	Yes %
Aberdeen Central	45.35	13,838	10,385	57.13	42.87
Aberdeen Donside	47.71	17,265	9,048	65.61	34.39
Aberdeen South and North Kincardine	52.37	17,945	9,818	64.64	35.36
Aberdeenshire East	52.68	19,538	10,359	65.35	34.65
Aberdeenshire West	53.37	18,119	10,131	64.14	35.86
Airdrie and Shotts	46.35	15,767	7,845	66.78	33.22
Almond Valley	51.44	18,871	11,458	62.22	37.78
Angus North and Mearns	47.79	16,739	7,877	68.00	32.00
Angus South	50.01	18,834	8,404	69.15	30.85
Argyll and Bute	53.73	16,580	9,526	63.51	36.49
Ayr	54.32	22,821	10,202	69.11	30.89
Banffshire and Buchan Coast	46.55	17,451	7,153	70.93	29.07
Caithness, Sutherland and Ross	52.15	17,848	10,364	63.26	36.74
Carrick, Cumnock and Doon Valley	48.13	20,100	8,384	70.57	29.43
Clackmannanshire and Dunblane	55.57	17,077	9,993	63.08	36.92
Clydebank and Milngavie	53.72	17,409	10,730	61.87	38.13
Clydesdale	52.50	19,605	10,109	65.98	34.02
Coatbridge and Chryston	45.31	14,905	8,122	64.73	35.27
Cowdenbeath	47.03	16,831	8,360	66.81	33.19
Cumbernauld and Kilsyth	52.14	16,024	8,857	64.40	35.60
Cunninghame North	52.31	19,299	9,935	66.02	33.98
Cunninghame South	43.03	14,679	7,173	67.17	32.83
Dumbarton	53.49	18,624	9,685	65.79	34.21
Dumfriesshire	53.46	22,472	9,236	70.87	29.13
Dunfermline	52.59	18,869	10,069	65.20	34.80
Dundee City East	48.34	16,557	9,048	64.66	35.34
Dundee City West	46.19	15,097	8,930	62.83	37.17
East Kilbride	51.16	19,103	10,568	64.38	35.62
East Lothian	56.98	20,619	11,237	64.73	35.27
Eastwood	63.02	20,768	10,914	65.55	34.45
Edinburgh Central	55.76	13,717	14,486	48.64	51.36
Edinburgh Eastern	55.54	17,953	12,110	59.72	40.28
Edinburgh North and Leith	54.06	15,034	14,995	50.06	49.94
Edinburgh Pentlands	58.11	19,090	10,614	64.27	35.73
Edinburgh Southern	62.57	16,569	16,549	50.03	49.97
Edinburgh Western	59.90	20,689	12,421	62.49	37.51
Ettrick, Roxburgh and Berwickshire	53.61	19,796	8,755	69.34	30.66
Falkirk East	49.88	19,037	8,871	68.21	31.79
Falkirk West	50.71	18,615	9,397	66.45	33.55
Galloway and West Dumfries	52.96	20,724	9,051	69.60	30.40
Glasgow Anniesland	43.43	13,891	9,819	58.59	41.41
Glasgow Cathcart	44.95	14,803	11,184	56.96	43.04
Glasgow Kelvin	40.49	9,875	14,083	41.22	58.78
Glasgow Maryhill and Springburn	36.47	10,624	9,636	52.44	47.56
Glasgow Pollok	39.43	14,437	8,257	63.62	36.38
Glasgow Provan	34.95	11,365	7,616	59.88	40.12
Glasgow Shettleston	38.20	13,412	7,518	64.08	35.92
Glasgow Southside	43.29	11,114	10,972	50.32	49.68
Greenock and Inverclyde	49.57	18,403	9,521	65.90	34.10
Hamilton, Larkhall and Stonehouse	45.15	14,963	10,181	59.51	40.49
Inverness and Nairn	53.21	20,415	11,653	63.66	36.34
Kilmarnock and Irvine Valley	50.19	21,785	9,825	68.92	31.08
Kirkcaldy	46.26	18,620	8,754	68.02	31.98
Linlithgow	52.97	22,324	11,450	66.10	33.90
Mid Fife and Glenrothes	48.82	17,830	8,014	68.99	31.01
Midlothian North and Musselburgh	51.42	19,203	10,220	65.27	34.73
Midlothian South, Tweeddale and Lauderdale	55.68	19,070	12,440	60.52	39.48
Moray	51.14	18,212	9,991	64.57	35.43
Motherwell and Wishaw	45.51	16,028	8,154	66.28	33.72
Na h-Eileanan an Iar	59.76	8,735	4,117	67.97	32.03
North East Fife	51.08	17,441	11,670	59.91	40.09
Orkney	49.27	4,829	3,187	60.24	39.76
Paisley	49.83	16,505	8,788	65.26	34.74
Perthshire North	56.58	20,173	9,383	68.25	31.75
Perthshire South and Kinross-shire	54.12	20,071	10,835	64.94	35.06
Renfrewshire North and West	55.91	18,200	9,070	66.74	33.26
Renfrewshire South	53.48	17,808	8,880	66.73	33.27
Rutherglen	46.76	17,407	9,495	64.71	35.29
Shetland	53.70	5,079	4,121	55.21	44.79
Skye, Lochaber and Badenoch	56.57	18,937	12,490	60.26	39.74
Stirling	58.55	18,683	11,270	62.37	37.63
Strathkelvin and Bearsden	57.06	21,775	11,761	64.93	35.07
Uddingston and Bellshill	44.85	16,480	8,289	66.53	33.47

== Wales ==
Results in Wales Results by local voting area: No: 50–55%; 55–60%; 60–65%; 65–70%; 70–75%; 75–80%; Yes: 50–55%; 55–60%; 60–65%

The constituencies of the National Assembly for Wales were used as the local voting areas for the referendum throughout Wales.

2011 United Kingdom Alternative Vote referendum (Wales)
Choice	Votes	%
Yes	325,349	34.55
No	616,307	65.45
Total	941,656	100.00
Valid votes	941,656	99.44
Invalid/blank votes	5,267	0.56
Total votes	946,923	100.00
Registered voters/turnout	2,268,739	41.74

Wales referendum results (excluding invalid votes)
Yes; 243,048 (28.3%)	No; 616,307 (71.7%)
▲50%

Wales was broken down into 40 voting areas.

Counting Area	Turnout %	No votes	Yes votes	No %	Yes %
Aberavon	36.96	11,951	6,626	64.33	35.67
Aberconwy	45.43	13,888	6,248	68.97	31.03
Alyn and Deeside	37.20	15,811	6,893	69.64	30.36
Arfon	43.20	9,889	7,674	56.31	43.69
Blaenau Gwent	37.77	13,364	6,521	67.21	32.79
Brecon and Radnorshire	52.83	17,806	10,348	63.25	36.75
Bridgend	40.91	16,066	7,732	67.51	32.49
Caerphilly	41.10	16,519	8,768	65.33	34.67
Cardiff Central	37.67	12,656	10,641	54.32	45.68
Cardiff North	51.55	22,128	11,952	64.93	35.07
Cardiff South and Penarth	37.23	16,597	10,562	61.11	38.89
Cardiff West	43.49	16,074	11,278	58.77	41.23
Carmarthen East and Dinefwr	51.57	18,243	9,447	65.88	34.12
Carmarthen West and South Pembrokeshire	48.03	19,197	8,632	68.98	31.02
Ceredigion	51.71	17,253	11,500	60.00	40.00
Clwyd South	37.26	13,329	6,606	66.86	33.14
Clwyd West	43.40	17,371	7,524	69.78	30.22
Cynon Valley	35.76	11,661	6,820	63.10	36.90
Delyn	43.50	16,043	7,138	69.21	30.79
Dwyfor Meirionnydd	46.81	13,268	7,425	64.12	35.88
Gower	43.38	17,394	9,251	65.28	34.72
Islwyn	37.80	14,068	6,618	68.01	31.99
Llanelli	44.26	17,033	8,643	66.34	33.66
Merthyr Tydfil and Rhymney	35.11	12,208	6,876	63.97	36.03
Monmouth	46.60	20,855	9,225	69.33	30.67
Montgomeryshire	47.40	14,750	8,154	64.40	35.60
Neath	41.57	15,401	8,303	64.97	35.03
Newport East	35.67	13,112	6,277	67.63	32.37
Newport West	36.86	15,643	7,293	68.20	31.80
Ogmore	36.58	13,192	6,923	65.58	34.42
Pontypridd	38.87	14,691	8,417	63.58	36.42
Preseli Pembrokeshire	47.14	18,392	8,651	68.01	31.99
Rhondda	37.63	12,356	7,194	63.54	36.46
Swansea East	31.37	12,146	6,578	64.87	35.13
Swansea West	35.34	13,308	8,355	61.43	38.57
Torfaen	36.44	14,724	7,398	66.56	33.44
Vale of Clwyd	40.87	15,767	7,080	69.01	30.99
Vale of Glamorgan	46.91	22,862	10,287	68.97	31.03
Wrexham	36.09	12,603	5,957	67.90	32.10
Ynys Môn	48.72	16,448	7,534	68.58	31.42
