= Jenkins Commission (UK) =

Independent Commission on the Voting System

The Independent Commission on the Voting System, popularly known as the Jenkins Commission after its chairman Roy Jenkins, was a commission into possible reform of the United Kingdom electoral system.

== The commission ==
The commission was set up in December 1997 by the Labour government with the support of the Liberal Democrats, to investigate alternatives to the single member plurality (or "first past the post") electoral system used for British general elections. A referendum was planned on whether to change the voting system.

The commission was asked to take into account four requirements:

1. broad proportionality,
2. the need for stable government,
3. an extension of voter choice, and
4. the maintenance of a link between MPs and geographical constituencies.

The commission reported in September 1998 and suggested the alternative vote top-up or AV+ system, which would directly elect some MPs by the alternative vote, with a number of additional members elected from top up lists similarly to Mixed-member proportional representation. The commission considered a single transferable vote system but rejected it because it would require massive constituencies of around 350,000 electors resulting in an oppressive degree of choice (i.e. too many candidates to choose from). Also, they described the counting of votes in STV as "incontestably opaque" and argued that different counting systems could produce different results. Finally, Jenkins rejected STV because it was a different system from those used in European and devolved parliaments, as well as the London Assembly.

== Actions taken from the commission ==
No action was taken by the Labour government to change the electoral system.

After the 2010 election, with a hung parliament, and the Liberal Democrats potentially holding the balance of power, AV+ was again the subject of discussion, as a potential part of a coalition deal. However, the eventual coalition's deal – between the Liberal Democrats and the Conservatives – specified that there would be a referendum on "the introduction of the Alternative Vote". This was confirmed in February 2011, when the referendum on AV (not AV+) was approved by Parliament.

The referendum took place on Thursday 5 May 2011, resulting in a 67.9% "No" vote, in favour of keeping the existing first-past-the-post; versus 32.1% "Yes" in favour of moving to AV. Of 440 voting areas (based on Parliamentary constituencies) only 10 of the 440 areas returned "yes" votes in favour of AV, of which six were in London, the others being Oxford and Cambridge, Edinburgh Central and Glasgow Kelvin.

== See also ==
- Elections in the United Kingdom
