= Power Inquiry =

The Power Inquiry final report - Power to the People

The POWER Inquiry was established in 2004 to explore how political participation and involvement can be increased and deepened in Britain. Its work is based on the primary belief that a healthy democracy requires the active participation of its citizens.

Since the historically unprecedented decline in turnout in the 2001 General Election, many political organisations have put considerable effort into analysing the roots of voter abstention and the current state of political engagement in the UK. This widely shared concern over declining electoral turnout served as the starting point for a broader investigation into the health of the connections between the public and the political process.

On 27 February 2006, the Power Commission published Power to the People, its final report, making 30 key recommendations designed to "save British democracy from meltdown".

The recommendations included decentralising power, from central government to local government, replacing the first-past-the-post electoral system with a more responsive one, reducing the voting age to 16, and giving citizens the right to initiate legislative processes.

"Power 2010" is an attempt to carry forward the concepts behind the Power Inquiry into the UK 2010 General Election.

== Funding and organisation ==
The Inquiry was promoted as politically neutral, and its steering group, the Commission, included the "great and good" from across the political spectrum. The composition of the Commission also sought to represent directly those not conventionally involved in a project of this type.

The Commissioners

- Helena Kennedy, Baroness Kennedy of the Shaws, QC - Chair
- Ferdinand Mount
- Emma B
- Paul Boakye
- Phil Carey (UK)
- Philip Dodd
- Ben Freeman
- Barbara Gill
- Bano Murtuja
- Frances O'Grady

POWER was funded and was established by the Joseph Rowntree Charitable Trust and the Joseph Rowntree Reform Trust Limited, to mark their centenary year.

== Key recommendations ==
- Donations on political parties to be capped at £10,000 from individuals and £100 per member of organisations, "subject to full democratic scrutiny within the organisation"
- A "voter vouchers" system, where individuals indicate if they wish to allocate £3 of state funding to a particular party
- Voters given the chance to put forward laws
- The voting age, and the minimum age at which people can stand for Parliament, to be reduced to 16
- A 70%-elected House of Lords
- Monthly logs to monitor ministerial contact with companies, lobbyists and Advocacy groups
- Restrictions on the powers of party whips
- The replacement of First-Past-The-Post with a "responsive electoral system - which offers voters a greater choice and diversity of parties and candidates" for all elections to the House of Commons, House of Lords and local councils.
  - "The closed party list system should have no place in modern elections."
- The election deposits system (currently £500) should be dropped in favour of requiring candidates to provide a certain number of signatures in order to stand in elections.
- "The realignment of constituency boundaries should be accelerated."
- Decentralising of powers to local government

== Reaction ==
The Independent newspaper covered the story with a front page splash titled Blueprint to give power to the people. The paper has been "campaigning for democracy" ever since the 2005 General Election, in which the Labour Party won 55.2% of the seats with just 35.3% of the votes. The newspaper ran a petition urging the Prime Minister to institute urgent reform of the voting system.

Helena Kennedy, Chair of the Inquiry, challenged politicians to, "rise above their party ranks and start treating democratic reform as a non-partisan necessity, not a political toy".

The Prime Minister's Official Spokesman said that the report dealt with many issues, which were all matters to be debated within parties and between parties, adding that the report had added to the debate.

Oliver Heald, Shadow Constitutional Affairs secretary for the Conservative Party, welcomed the call to give more power to MPs, but opposed the plan to drop the voting age to 16. The Acting President of the Liberal Democrats, Simon Hughes, welcomed the report, saying "British democracy is in crisis whatever the Government pretends - most voters are ignored and most people feel they have no influence".

== Conference ==
On 6 May 2006, the Inquiry concluded with a free conference held at the Queen Elizabeth II Conference Centre in London. Speakers included Power Commissioners, the Leader of the Conservative party David Cameron and the Leader of the Liberal Democrats Sir Menzies Campbell. The plenary sitting split into eight 'breakout' sessions where particular aspects of the Commission's recommendations were discussed. These sessions, and the organisations sponsoring them, were:

- Politics, Citizenship & Young People (Carnegie Young People Initiative)
- Direct Democracy: Ideas for Citizen Power (Charter 88)
- Reviving Political Parties for Democracy (Demos)
- Parliament: Fit for (What) Purpose? (Hansard Society)
- Citizens and the State: A Marriage of Inconvenience? (Involve)
- The Future of Local and Neighbourhood Government (Local Government Information Unit)
- Clean Politics: Fair Votes (New Politics Network)
- Global Power - Is Parliament Relevant? (One World Trust)

The conference finished with a Question Time debate on 'Prospects for Democratic Change', chaired by Helena Kennedy with the following panellists:

- Nicholas Boles (Director, the Policy Exchange)
- Saira Khan (Businesswoman, TV presenter, author, runner-up on the first series of The Apprentice)
- Ed Miliband (Labour MP, former advisor to Gordon Brown and newly appointed Parliamentary Secretary to the Cabinet Office)
- Peter Tatchell (Human rights campaigner)

During the conference, David Cameron gave his support to a majority-elected House of Lords for the first time, saying, "In my view the Lords must have a significant elected element if it is to play a full and proper role". He also made strong comments on the future of the Royal Prerogative, saying "It's time to look at the power of the Executive to ride roughshod over the Legislature".

Many questions were asked of all the speakers by those attending the conference, and a lively debate took place over issues such as proportional representation for general elections and direct democracy initiatives such as referendums.

== Power 2010 ==
"Power 2010" is an attempt to carry forward the concepts behind the Power Inquiry into the UK 2010 General Election.

Five key constitutional reforms have been identified in a nationwide poll - introduce proportional representation, abolish ID cards, replace the Lords with an elected chamber, allow only English MPs to vote on English laws, and draw up a written constitution.

Power 2010 is attempting to get voters and candidates in the UK 2010 General Election to endorse these reforms by signing a personal pledge.
