= Active Citizens Transform =

British political pressure group

Active Citizens Transform was founded in 2004 by Charles Secrett, former Executive Director of the environmental organisation Friends of the Earth, and Ron Bailey as a new non-party political movement in the United Kingdom. It aims to mobilise citizens to transform the United Kingdom into a vibrant, participatory and sustainable society. It opposes the "first-past-the-post" electoral system.

ACT published an advertisement in 2005 criticising Labour party members of parliament who promised to support environmental policies but, under pressure from the Labour party's leadership, voted against environmental measures opposed by the British government. The advertisement was criticised by the Advertising Standards Authority for making misleading claims.

One of ACT's main projects was Local Works the successful campaign for the Sustainable Communities Bill. ACT inherited this campaign from the New Economics Foundation.

In 2006, ACT formally merged with Charter88, which in turn merged with the New Politics Network in 2007 to form Unlock Democracy.
