= Power 2010 =

Power 2010 was a campaign to reform the Parliament of the United Kingdom.

The campaign first aimed to identify five key reforms to the parliamentary system that the public most wanted to see enacted. The aim was then to ensure that every candidate standing in the UK 2010 General Election backed those reforms.

== Roots ==
Between November 2005 and March 2006 the Power Commission examined the problem of democratic disengagement in the United Kingdom. A report was produced which highlighted the "Myth of Apathy" and the lack of political engagement, but very little action resulted from the report. Helena Kennedy, Baroness Kennedy of The Shaws, a frequently-rebellious Labour peer, who chaired the Power Commission, also chairs Power 2010, which aims to carry forward the concepts behind the Power Commission into the UK 2010 General Election.

The campaign is funded by the Joseph Rowntree Reform Trust (previously the Joseph Rowntree Charitable Trust) and has been endorsed by activists such as Billy Bragg and Mark Thomas.

== The campaign ==
The campaign has four phases.

=== Phase one ===
The first phase of the campaign (which has now closed) asked for suggestions from the public. The campaign received thousands of ideas from people of all political persuasions from across the UK.

The call for ideas went out on 15 September and by midnight on 30 November 2009 over 4,000 had been submitted.

=== Phase two ===
The thousands of ideas were organised by academics from Southampton University and fed into a deliberative poll to draw up a shortlist which would be put to the public vote.

On the weekend of 9–10 January 2010, a scientific sample of 130 citizens from across the UK, selected by YouGov to be representative of the population as a whole gathered in London for a two-day deliberative event. These 130 citizens participated in a Deliberative Poll organised in consultation with Professor James Fishkin of Stanford University and his colleagues at the Center for Deliberative Democracy at Stanford University, Professor Robert C. Luskin and Dr. Alice Siu.

In this way, these 130 citizens distilled the many ideas received into a manageable shortlist of 29 proposals, each of which received the backing of a majority of participants. These were then put to the public vote.

=== Phase three ===
The public vote on the 29 ideas shortlisted by the Deliberative Poll began on 18 January and lasted five weeks until 22 February. During this time 100,000 votes were cast by tens of thousands of people. The five most popular ideas following the vote produced the POWER2010 Pledge.

=== Pledge signing ===
Following 22 February Power2010 have begun a grass roots campaign requesting members of the public to sign a petition to back to power pledge. Currently there is no published total for the number of signatures collected as of March 2010.

The public have been asked to sign the power pledge if they agree with three or more of the five power pledges, with the option to opt out of a particular pledge that they may not agree with.

== The power pledges ==
The five power pledges adopted by Power 2010 following the public vote were:

1. Introduce a proportional voting system.

2. Scrap ID cards and roll back the database state.

3. Replace the House of Lords with an elected chamber.

4. Allow only English MPs to vote on English laws.

5. Draw up a written constitution.

== 2010 General Election campaign ==
The aim was for as many people as possible to sign the Pledge and then take it to the candidates in their constituency, by writing to them, calling them, and attending local hustings, public meetings and MPs' surgeries. Ideally, every candidate standing in the UK 2010 General Election should make a public commitment to clean up and reform British politics.

In March 2010, Power 2010 ran a full page ad in The Guardian targeting 6 MPs that it claimed were "failing our democracy" for being most against parliamentary reform. Some of the MPs in question have responded by questioning the motives of Power 2010 and claiming that it is a front for the Liberal Democrats.

The 6 MPs were:

- Shipley Conservative MP Philip Davies, who was re-elected with an increased majority.
- Harrow East Labour MP Tony McNulty, who lost his seat to Bob Blackman of the Conservatives.
- Glasgow South Labour MP Tom Harris, who was re-elected with an increased majority.
- Shrewsbury Conservative MP Daniel Kawczynski, who was re-elected with an increased majority.
- Cardiff South and Penarth Labour MP Alun Michael, who was re-elected with a reduced majority
- Wells Conservative MP David Heathcoat-Amory, who lost his seat to Liberal Democrat Tessa Munt.

== See also ==
- Constitution of the United Kingdom
- Make Votes Matter
- NO2ID
- Power Inquiry
- Reform of the House of Lords
- UK 2010 General Election
