= Helena Kennedy, Baroness Kennedy of The Shaws =

Scottish barrister, broadcaster, and politician (born 1950)

The Right Honourable The Baroness Kennedy of The Shaws LT KC FRSA FCGI
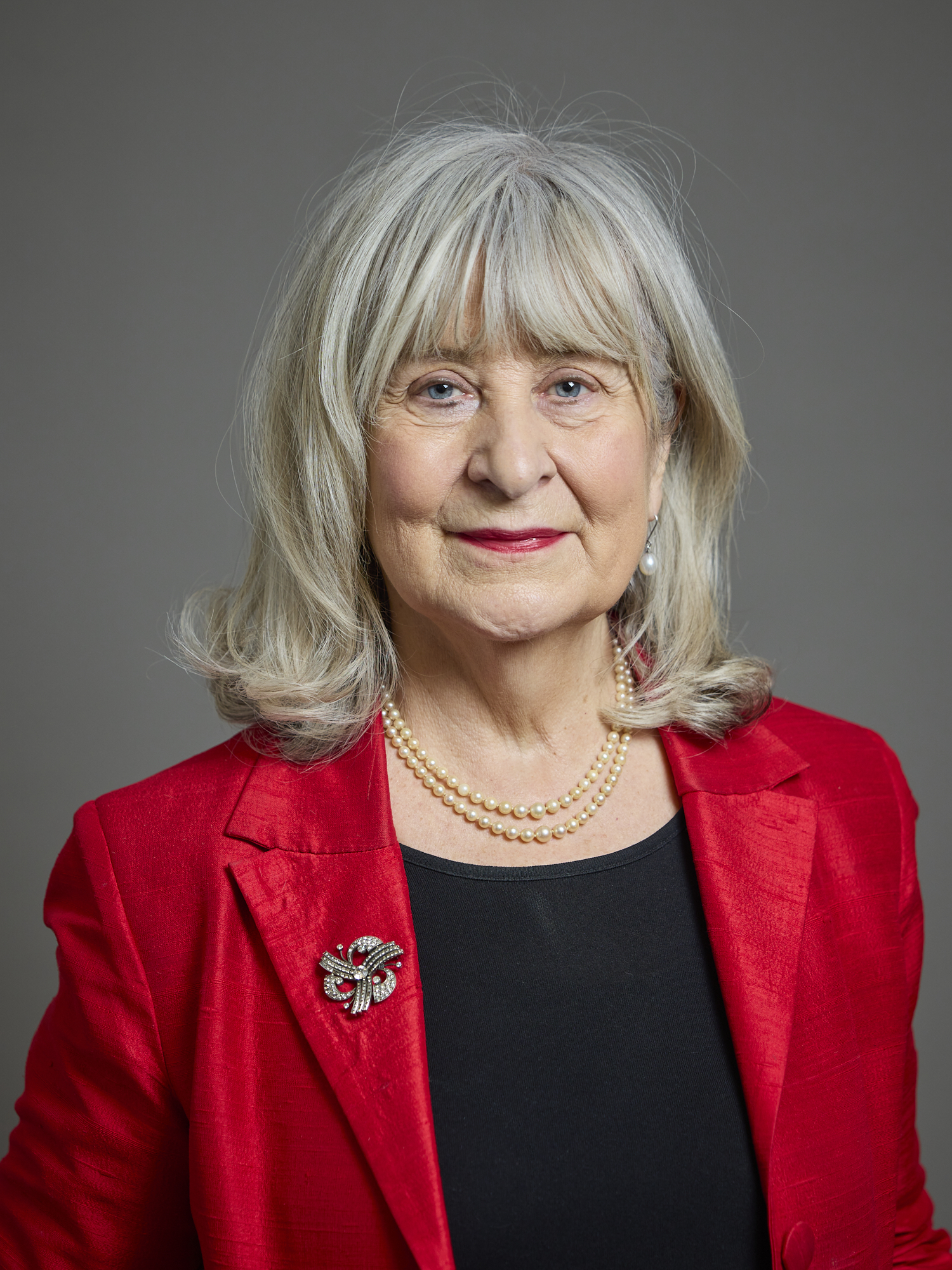
- Official portrait, 2025

Chancellor of Sheffield Hallam University
- In office 26 July 2018 – 8 May 2025
- Preceded by: Robert Winston, Baron Winston
- Succeeded by: Uriah Rennie

Principal of Mansfield College, Oxford
- In office September 2011 – 2018
- Preceded by: Diana Walford
- Succeeded by: Helen Mountfield

Member of the House of Lords
- Lord Temporal
- Life peerage 27 October 1997

Personal details
- Born: Helena Ann Kennedy; 12 May 1950 (age 76) Glasgow, Scotland
- Party: Labour
- Spouse: Iain Louis Hutchison (m. 1986)
- Domestic partner: Iain Mitchell (1978–1984)
- Children: 3
- Occupation: Barrister; television presenter
- Website: helenakennedy.co.uk

Helena Ann Kennedy, Baroness Kennedy of The Shaws (born 12 May 1950), is a Scottish barrister, broadcaster, and Labour member of the House of Lords. She was Principal of Mansfield College, Oxford, from 2011 to 2018. A bencher of Gray's Inn, she is an Honorary Writer to the Signet and the recipient of 42 honorary degrees from many universities including those of Glasgow and Edinburgh in recognition of work on women and the law and on widening participation in higher education. She is president of Justice, the law reform think tank, and director of the International Bar Association's Human Rights Institute (IBAHRI). In 2024, Kennedy succeeded Lord Neuberger of Abbotsbury as chair of the High Level Panel of Legal Experts on Media Freedom.

== Early life and education ==
Kennedy was born on 12 May 1950 in Glasgow, Scotland, one of the four daughters of Mary Veronica (née Jones) and Joshua Patrick Kennedy, nicknamed "Mae" and "Joss", respectively. Her parents were committed Labour activists and devoutly Catholic. Her father, who served for six years in the British Armed Forces during World War II, was a printer with the Daily Record and a trade union official, and her mother, who worked in a grocery store, volunteered to help women who suffered from domestic violence or alcoholism in the family.

She attended Holyrood Secondary School in Glasgow, where she was appointed Head Girl. After applying unsuccessfully for a degree in English at the London School of Economics in 1968 and taking a gap year on the advice of her interviewer Bill Wedderburn, she studied law at the Council of Legal Education in London.

== Legal career ==
In 1972, Kennedy was called to the bar at Gray's Inn. In 1974, with the help of a loan, she co-founded Garden Court Chambers (initially 7 Stone Buildings) at Lincoln's Inn with two female and three male colleagues, including Michael House, Marguerite Russell and David Watkinson. Among her many cases, Kennedy acted as junior counsel for child murderer Myra Hindley during her 1974 trial for plotting to escape from Holloway Prison, and was involved as a barrister in the 1984 Brighton hotel bombing trial in 1986 and in the successful Guildford Four appeal in 1989. She moved to Doughty Street Chambers in 1990.

She was a member of the General Council of the Bar from 1990 to 1993 and was appointed a Queen's Counsel in 1991.

== Politics ==
Kennedy was a member of the Communist Party of Great Britain during the early 1970s, which she later regretted. She gained wider recognition with her appearances on radio shows, including BBC Radio 4's Woman's Hour, in the 1980s.

She served as the chair of Charter 88 from 1992 to 1997, and became closely affiliated to the educational charity Common Purpose.

She was a high-profile supporter of Tony Blair's New Labour during the 1990s. She was made a life peer in October 1997 on account of her role as chair of Charter 88, whose constitutional reform policies had been adopted by the Labour Party, and joined the party on the same day. Following her appointment, she became a prominent critic of the party's direction, although she wrote in 2008 that the first Blair ministry "produced more far-reaching reforms than anything seen since the Great Reform Act" of 1832. She has rebelled against her party whip in the House of Lords more frequently than any other Labour peer, with a dissent rate of 11.5% as of 2025.

In May 2009, in reaction to the United Kingdom parliamentary expenses scandal, she launched the campaign for a referendum on a "more proportional electoral system" at the following election with an open letter in The Guardian, which eventually led to the 2011 United Kingdom Alternative Vote referendum. She was subsequently reported to be organising a coalition of independent candidates to run in the election against the MPs involved in the expenses scandal, who included members of her own party, but denied the allegation.

In April 2017, she led the open letter call for Jeremy Corbyn's Labour Party to stand down its candidates in the seats of Brighton Pavilion and the Isle of Wight in favour of the Green Party at the 2017 general election, following two similar concessions by the Green Party.

In 2020, she worked with the Conservative MP Iain Duncan Smith and democracy activist Luke de Pulford to create the global pressure group Inter-Parliamentary Alliance on China. In March 2021, China placed sanctions on her. The sanctions were condemned by the Prime Minister and led the Foreign Secretary to summon the Chinese ambassador. The sanctions were lifted on 30 January 2026 during a visit by Prime Minister Keir Starmer to China.

== Academia ==
Kennedy became the first chancellor of Oxford Brookes University, serving from 1994 until 2001.

In 1998, she agreed to lend her name to Ann Limb's charitable initiative to fund higher education for disadvantaged students, which became the Helena Kennedy Foundation.

She was elected principal of Mansfield College, Oxford, in July 2010 and served in the role from September 2011. She retired in 2018 and became chancellor of Sheffield Hallam University on 26 July 2018.

== Personal life ==
From 1978 to 1984 she lived with the actor Iain Mitchell, and together they had a son. In 1986 Kennedy married Iain Louis Hutchison, a surgeon, with whom she has a daughter and a son. She has five grandchildren.

Kennedy regularly attends Mass and professes that her Catholicism "remains very much part of who I am", even though she eschews its more traditional values.

In 2023 she took part in the Coronation of Charles III and Camilla at Westminster Abbey, carrying the Queen Consort's Rod with Dove.

== Honours ==
She has received numerous awards, including:

- Fellow of the Royal Society of Arts (FRSA)
- Fellow of the City and Guilds of London Institute (FCGI)
- Member of the Académie Universelle des Cultures (Paris)
- Honorary Fellow, Royal College of Psychiatrists, 2005
- Honorary Fellow, Royal College of Paediatrics and Child Health, 2005
- Honorary Fellow, Institute of Advanced Legal Studies
- Honorary Fellow, Lucy Cavendish College, University of Cambridge, 2010
- Honorary Fellow, School of Oriental and African Studies (SOAS), 2011
- Honorary Doctorate of Law, Plymouth University, 2012
- Honorary Fellow of the Royal Society of Edinburgh (HonFRSE), 2014
- She was recognized as one of the BBC's 100 Women of 2021.
- She was chosen to carry the Queen's Rod in the Royal Procession at the Coronation of Charles III and Camilla.
- She was appointed as a Lady of the Most Ancient and Most Noble Order of the Thistle (LT) by King Charles III in 2024.

== Broadcasting ==
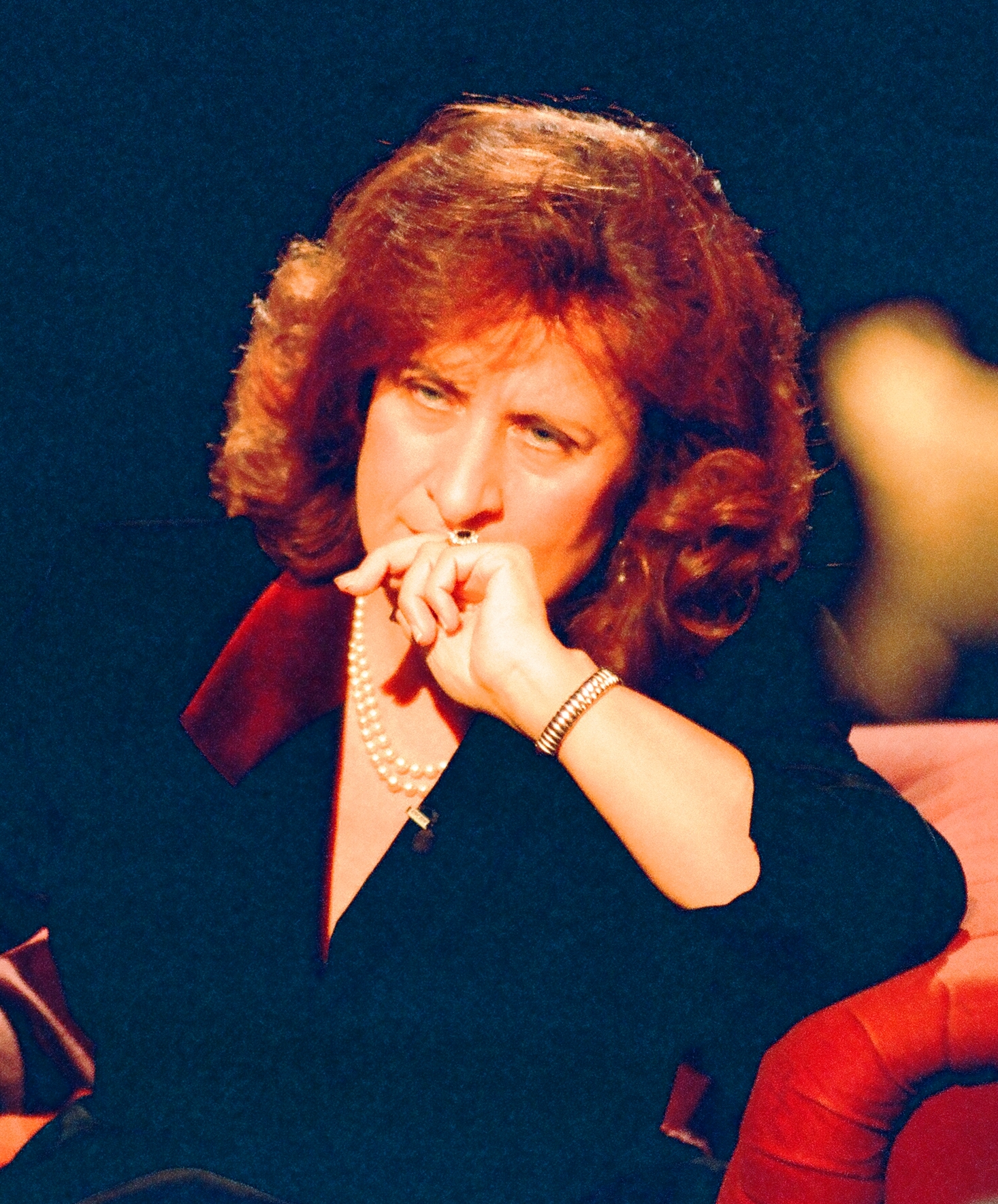
Hosting After Dark in 1997

- Creator: Blind Justice, BBC TV, 1987
- Presenter: Heart of the Matter, BBC TV, 1987
- After Dark, Channel 4 and BBC4, 1987–2003
  - Kennedy presented many editions of this series, including the 1991 "Do Men Have To Be Violent" featuring an inebriated Oliver Reed who insulted and attempted to kiss feminist Kate Millett, as well as the 1995 special "Ireland: Sex & Celibacy, Church & State" which included an unscheduled last-minute appearance from singer Sinéad O'Connor.
- Presenter: Raw Deal on Medical Negligence, BBC TV, 1989
- Presenter: The Trial of Lady Chatterley's Lover, BBC Radio 4, 1990
- Presenter: Time Gentlemen, Please, BBC Scotland, 1994 (Winner, Television Programme Award category, 1994 Industrial Journalism Awards)

== Appointments ==
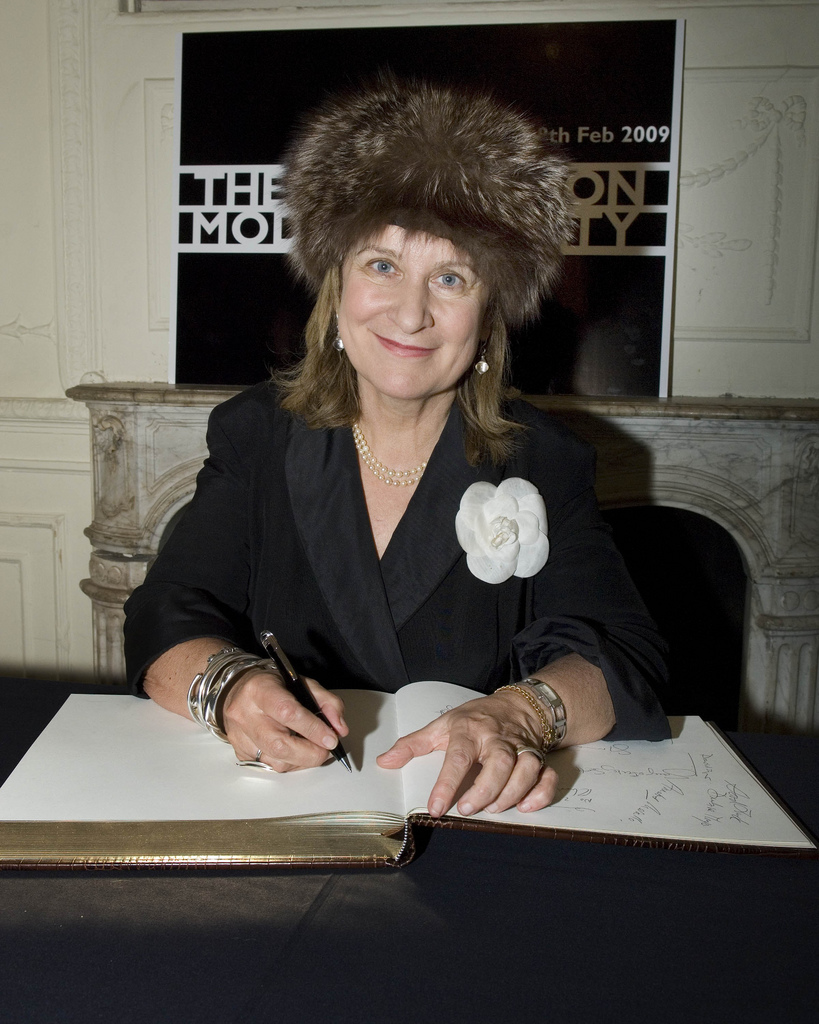
Kennedy signing The Convention on Modern Liberty in January 2009

=== Legal, political and governmental ===
- President of Council (formerly Chair), JUSTICE
- Director, International Bar Association's Human Rights Institute (IBAHRI)
- Chair, High Level Panel of Legal Experts on Media Freedom (2024–)
- Member of the High Level Panel of Legal Experts on Media Freedom
- Member of the World Bank Institute's External Advisory Council (1998–2005)
- Member of the International Bar Association's Task Force on Terrorism (2001–2003)
- Former member of the Foreign Policy Centre's Advisory Council
- Former board member of the Institute for Strategic Dialogue (2010)
- Co-director (with Kate Mallinson), Future of Russia Foundation (2016–2019) (Note: Established by Mikhail Khodorkovsky, Henry Kissinger, Mikhail Piotrovsky and Jacob Rothschild in 2002.)
- Commissioner, CIBA Commission on Child Sexual Abuse within the Family (sponsored by the CIBA Foundation, 1981–1983)
- Commissioner, BAFTA Inquiry into the future of the BBC, 1990–1993
- Commissioner, National Commission on Education (NCE, sponsored by Paul Hamlyn Foundation, 1991–1994)
- Chair, Widening Participation Committee, Further Education Funding Council (1994–1997)
- Chair, Reading Borough Council's Commission of Inquiry into the health, environmental and safety aspects of the Atomic Weapons Establishment at Aldermaston (final report Secrecy versus Safety, published in 1994)
- Chair, Howard League's Commission of Inquiry into Violence in Penal Institutions for Young People (the final report, Banged Up, Beaten Up, Cutting Up, published in 1995)
- Chair, Royal Colleges of Pathologists' and of Paediatrics' Inquiry into Sudden Infant Death (producing a protocol for the investigation of such deaths in 2004)
- Commission Chair of the Power Inquiry (November 2005 – March 2006) (Note: Examined the problem of democratic disengagement in the United Kingdom. A report was produced which highlighted the "Myth of Apathy" and the lack of political engagement.)
- Chair of Power 2010 (extending the Power Inquiry to the 2010 general election)
- Commissioner, Government Commission on a British Bill of Rights (2010)

=== Academic and professional ===
- Chancellor of Oxford Brookes University (1993–2001)
- Chair, British Council (1998–2004)
- Chair, Human Genetics Commission (1998–2007)
- President of the Board the Governors of the School of Oriental and African Studies (SOAS, 2002–2012)
- Chair of the Board of Governors for the United World College of the Atlantic (2005–2009)
- Chancellor of Sheffield Hallam University (2018–2025)
- Vice-president of the Haldane Society of Socialist Lawyers (since at least 1986)
- Vice-president of the Association of Women Barristers

=== Economic and cultural ===
- Chair of the board of the Creative Industries Independent Standards Authority (CIISA, established by Heather Rabbatts, 2024–)
- Trustee, The Tablet Trust
- Trustee, KPMG Foundation
- Trustee, Media Standards Trust (2006–2015)
- Member of the board of Hampstead Theatre (1986–1991)
- Member of the board of New Statesman and Society (1990s)
- Member of the board of Independent News and Media (1998–2010)
- Member of the board of the British Museum (2004–2012)

=== Charitable ===
- President, Helena Kennedy Foundation (1998–)
- Co-director (with David Sagal), Clooney Foundation for Justice (2025–)
- President of the National Children's Bureau (1998–2005)
- President, Women of the Year Lunch (2010–2015)
- Chair, Booker Prize Foundation (2015–2020)
- Former Vice President of the Campaign for Homosexual Equality (from 2017)
- Honorary Patron and former president, Medical Aid for Palestinians
- Patron (formerly Chair, 1991–1998 or 1994–2002), London International Festival of Theatre
- Council member, Howard League for Penal Reform (1992–2002)
- Member of the advisory board, International Centre for Prison Studies
- Patron, Burma Campaign UK, the London-based group campaigning for human rights and democracy in Burma
- Patron, upReach, a UK social mobility charity that supports undergraduates from low income backgrounds pursuing competitive graduate careers.
- Patron, Public Law Project
- Patron, Institute for Learning (IfL)
- Patron, Liberty
- Patron, UNLOCK, The National Association of Ex-Offenders
- Patron, Debt Doctors Foundation UK (DD-UK)
- Patron, Tower Hamlets Summer University
- Patron, Rights Watch (UK)
- Patron of SafeHands for Mothers, a UK-based charity whose mission is to improve maternal and newborn health by harnessing the power of the visual, through the production of films.
- Patron of The Death Penalty Project

== Civic honours ==
- Created a life peer as Baroness Kennedy of The Shaws, of Cathcart in the City of Glasgow on 27 October 1997.
- Grand Cross of the Order of Merit of the Italian Republic on 23 March 2004.
- Commander of the Order of Academic Palms (2006).

== Bibliography ==
- Eve was Framed: Women and British Justice, 1993; ISBN 0-09-922441-0
- Legal Conundrums in Our Brave New World, 1994; ISBN 0421851902 (based on the 54th Hamlyn Lectures)
- Just Law: The Changing Face of Justice and Why It Matters to Us, 2004; ISBN 0-09-945833-0
- Eve Was Shamed: How British Justice Is Failing Women, 2018; ISBN 9781784742225
- Misjustice: How British Law is Failing Women, 2019; ISBN 9781784707682
- Misogyny: A Human Rights Issue, 2022; ISBN 9781802017571

== Notes ==
Academic offices
New university	Chancellor of Oxford Brookes University; 1994–2001	Succeeded by Jon Snow
Preceded by Diana Walford	Principal of Mansfield College, Oxford; 2011–2018	Succeeded by Helen Mountfield
Preceded by Robert Winston	Chancellor of Sheffield Hallam University; 2018–present	Incumbent
