= Boy with Beer =

- Written by: Paul Boakye
- Genre: Drama
- Setting: A London flat

Premiere
- Date: January 14th 1992

Boy with Beer is a 1992 British in three acts play written by Paul Boakye and first performed at the Man in the Moon Theatre in January 1992. The play takes place over three nights each separated by one month. Boy with Beer is published by Methuen Drama in Black Plays 3 edited by Yvonne Brewster (1995).

== Synopsis ==
Boy with Beer is the story of a growing love affair between two black men, fraught with prejudice and the pressures of machismo. Upwardly mobile Ghanaian photographer, Karl, is the older man in search of his "African Prince." What he finds is Donovan, a confused twenty-one-year-old Caribbean van driver he met in a heterosexual nightclub. The two men exchange telephone numbers and agree to meet. The play opens as Donovan shows up outside Karl's flat the next night.

Boakye covers a good deal of this affair from the first unromantic, unprotected coupling to a semblance of understanding and shared brotherhood one month later, followed by a final admission of love and acceptance between the two men albeit under the shadow of HIV/AIDS. In the final act, Donovan's pregnant girlfriend has discovered that she is HIV-positive. She has decided to terminate their child. Donovan turns up at Karl's home in tears. As the poetry writing, thoughtful sort, what should Karl do? He is in love with this confused, inarticulate homeboy, and Donovan, too, finally accepts his sexuality and that he has liked Karl from the start. He is indeed "a big black battyman…in love with big black men."

== Theatrical productions ==
- 14 January to 1 February 1992 (World premiere): A House of Boache Production in association with This is Now Theatre Company at Man in the Moon Theatre, London, directed by Steven Luckie with Clive Wedderburn as Karl, and Tunde Oba as Donovan.
- 7 April to 25 April 1992 (Sponsored by Stratford East): Man in the Moon Theatre, London, directed by Steven Luckie with Clive Wedderburn as Karl, and Tunde Oba as Donovan.
- October 1994: Ovalhouse Theatre, London, directed by Steven Luckie with Treva Sealy as Karl, and John-Lloyd Stephenson as Donovan.
- 27 October to 13 November 1994 (Extended run): Ovalhouse Theatre, London, directed by Steven Luckie with Treva Sealy as Karl, and Tunde Oba as Donovan.
- 14 April 2014 (South Africa): Drama & Production Studies Department at Durban University of Technology. Directed by Nqobile Cele with Kwenza Ngcobo and Thembinkosi Mthembu.
- 8 November 2016 to 26 November 2016 (King's Head Theatre - 25th Anniversary Production): Directed by Harry Mackrill with Enyi Okoronkwo as Donovan and Chin Nyenwe as Karl featuring new music from Taurean Antoine Chagar, regular collaborator of acclaimed drum and bass group Rudimental.
