= Lords Temporal =

Secular members of the House of Lords

The Lords Temporal are secular members of the House of Lords (contrasted with the Lords Spiritual, bishops in the Church of England), the upper house of the British Parliament. Before the passage of the House of Lords (Hereditary Peers) Act 2026, they consisted of both life peers and hereditary peers, but now is solely composed of the former after the right of hereditary peers to sit in the House of Lords was abolished.

== History ==
Membership in the Lords Temporal was once an entitlement of all hereditary peers, other than those in the peerage of Ireland. Under the House of Lords Act 1999, the right to membership was restricted to 92 hereditary peers and then abolished entirely on 29 April 2026 as a result of the House of Lords (Hereditary Peers) Act 2026. This Act brought an end to more than 700 years of hereditary peers sitting in the House of Lords.

Further reform of the House of Lords is a perennially discussed issue in British politics. The Wakeham Commission, which debated the issue of lords' reform under then Prime Minister Tony Blair, proposed making some of the Lords Temporal elected positions. This plan, which was widely criticised, failed to advance in the House of Commons. Additional proposals were made under the coalition government of Prime Minister David Cameron to reduce the size of the House of Lords to 450, directly elect at least some of the Lords Temporal, and allow members of the House of Commons to run for election as Lords Temporal. None of these proposals passed.

== Composition of the Lords Temporal ==
After the passage of the House of Lords (Hereditary Peers) Act 2026, The Lords Temporal consist solely of life peers.

=== Life peers ===
The only group of Lords Temporal, and largest group of the whole House, are life peers. As of March 2024 there are 670 life peers. Life peerages rank only as barons or baronesses, and are created under the Life Peerages Act 1958. Like all other peers, life peers are created by the Crown, who acts on the advice of the Prime Minister or the House of Lords Appointments Commission. However, by convention, the Prime Minister allows leaders of other parties to nominate some life peers, to maintain political equilibrium.

In 2000, the government announced it would set up an Independent Appointments Commission, under Lord Stevenson of Coddenham, to select fifteen so-called "people's peers" for life peerages.

=== Defunct groupings ===
==== Hereditary peers ====
The Lords Temporal had historically included several hundred hereditary peers (English peers as well as Scottish Lords of Parliament). Such hereditary offices can be created by the Crown and in modern times are usually created only under the advice of the Prime Minister.

Holders of Scottish and Irish peerages were not always permitted to sit in the Lords. When Scotland united with England to form Great Britain in 1707, it was provided that the Scottish hereditary peers would only be able to elect 16 Scottish representative peers to sit in the House of Lords; the term of a representative was to extend until the next general election. A similar provision was enacted when Ireland merged with Great Britain in 1801 to form the United Kingdom; the Irish peers were allowed to elect 28 representatives, who were to retain office for life. Elections for Irish representatives ended in 1922, when most of Ireland became an independent state; elections for Scottish representatives ended with the passage of the Peerage Act 1963, under which all Scottish peers obtained seats in the Upper House.

After the 1999 reform, only 92 hereditary peers remained as Lords Temporal and this privilege was abolished entirely after the 2026 reforms under the Starmer ministry.

==== Law lords ====
Until the establishment of the Supreme Court in 2009, a subset of the Lords Temporal – known as the Law Lords – acted as the final court of appeal in the United Kingdom judicial system. These lords became the first justices of the UK Supreme Court.
