= Charter 88 =

British pressure group

Charter 88 was a British pressure group that advocated constitutional and electoral reform and owes its origins to the lack of a written constitution. It began as a special edition of the New Statesman magazine in 1988 and it took its name from Charter 77 – the Czechoslovak dissident movement co-founded by Václav Havel. It was a successor to the popular mid-19th century Chartist Movement of England that resulted in an unsuccessful campaign for a People's Charter and also Magna Carta or 'Great Charter' of 1215. In November 2007, Charter 88 merged with the New Politics Network to form Unlock Democracy.

== History ==
=== Formation ===
Charter 88 was created by 348 mainly Liberal and Social Democratic British intellectuals and activists. They signed a letter to the New Statesman magazine as "a general expression of dissent" following the 1987 General Election victory of the Conservative Party, led by Prime Minister Margaret Thatcher. This was then followed by further advertisements in The Guardian and The Independent. Five thousand signatures were published in The Observer newspaper in January 1989, followed by the establishment of an organisation.

The organisation was offered space within the offices of the New Statesman magazine, then based in Shoreditch. For several years it was based in offices in Exmouth Market, Clerkenwell. It later moved to the Institute of Community Studies (now The Young Foundation) in Bethnal Green. Its initial activity resulted in the creation of a Charter which the public was invited to sign and to support with financial contributions. Anthony Barnett was the first Director and Andrew Puddephatt, former General Secretary of Liberty, became the director of Charter 88 in 1995.

=== Source of inspiration ===
Charter 88 was the brainchild of New Statesman editor Stuart Weir and came into existence as a direct response to Thatcherism in Britain in the 1980s. It closely followed the methodology that had been employed by Charter 77 in Czechoslovakia during 1977. Charter 77 originally appeared as a manifesto published in a West German newspaper that was signed by Czechoslovak citizens representing various occupations, political viewpoints, and religions. The manifesto was reprinted and circulated as a document inviting other signatures and by the mid-1980s it had been signed by 1,200 people.

=== The Original Charter 88 ===
The Original Charter of Charter 88 was explicitly concerned with institutional change:

We have had less freedom than we believed. That which we have enjoyed has been too dependent on the benevolence of our rulers. Our freedoms have remained their possession, rationed out to us as subjects rather than being our own inalienable possession as citizens. To make real the freedoms we once took for granted means for the first time to take them for ourselves. The time has come to demand political, civil and human rights in the United Kingdom. We call, therefore, for a new constitutional settlement which will:

- Enshrine, by means of a Bill of Rights, such civil liberties as the right to peaceful assembly, to freedom of association, to freedom from discrimination, to freedom from detention without trial, to trial by jury, to privacy and to freedom of expression.
- Subject Executive powers and prerogatives, by whomsoever exercised, to the rule of law.
- Establish freedom of information and open government.
- Create a fair electoral system of proportional representation.
- Reform the Upper House to establish a democratic, non-hereditary Second Chamber.
- Place the Executive under the power of a democratically renewed Parliament and all agencies of the state under the rule of law.
- Ensure the independence of a reformed judiciary.
- Provide legal remedies for all abuses of power by the state and by officials of central and local government.
- Guarantee an equitable distribution of power between the nations of the United Kingdom and between local, regional and central government.
- Draw up a written constitution anchored in the ideal of universal citizenship, that incorporates these reforms.

The inscription of laws does not guarantee their realisation. Only people themselves can ensure freedom, democracy and equality before the law. Nonetheless, such ends are far better demanded, and more effectively obtained and guarded, once they belong to everyone by inalienable right. Add your name to ours. sign the charter now!

=== Support ===
Since 1988, approximately 85,000 people have signed the Charter, over which time the aim of the movement has changed considerably.

Among its early supporters in the British entertainment industry was singer Billy Bragg. He had earlier given his support to the left-wing Red Wedge British youth political movement. Red Wedge closely allied itself with Labour Party leader Neil Kinnock in his unsuccessful attempt to defeat the Conservative Party. The writer Harold Pinter, composer Simon Rattle, actor John Cleese and actress Emma Thompson were also early supporters. Other signatories from the entertainment world included actor Ray McAnally, who played the left-wing Prime Minister in the TV film A Very British Coup, whilst other famous names included novelists Salman Rushdie, Ian McEwan, Julian Barnes, A.S. Byatt, Margaret Drabble, and Angela Carter.

Other famous signatories included Martin Amis, Melvyn Bragg, Tim Clement-Jones, Judi Dench, Terry Eagleton, Antonia Fraser, Clement Freud, Stuart Hall, and Christopher Hitchens.

Signatory Lord Scarman chaired the launch in the House of Commons of Charter 88's strategy document 'We can Make it Happen in the Next Ten years', and remained a behind the scenes influence.

The intellectual left provided notable signatories however in the form of Ralph Miliband, Robin Blackburn and feminist Sheila Rowbotham.

In 1988 Neil Kinnock is alleged to have described Charter 88 as a movement of "whiners, whingers and wankers", though he and his wife Glenys Kinnock later signed the charter. Tony Blair acknowledged his agreement with many of the aims and intentions of Charter 88.

=== People ===
==== Council Chair ====
- Stuart Weir and Richard Holme (jointly) 1988–1989
- Beverley Anderson 1989 – 1992
- Helena Kennedy 1992 – 1997
- Paul Farthing 1998 – 2003
- Debbie Chay 2003 – 2005
- Vicky Seddon 2005 – 2007

==== Directors ====
- Anthony Barnett (1988–95)
- Andrew Puddephatt (1995–98)
- Pam Giddy (1998–02)
- Karen Bartlett (2002–03)
- Phil Starr (2003–04)
- Ron Bailey (2004–06, co-director)
- Peter Facey (2004–06, co-director; 2006–07)

=== Later developments ===
In June 2003, the chair of the Charter 88 executive and management committee and active contributor Paul Hirst died suddenly. Along with this, the organisation's financial situation and a period of resignations and redundancies, created a crisis situation in late 2003.

From 2004, Charter 88 developed partnerships with two organisations:

- The New Politics Network was created in 2000 following the winding up of Democratic Left
- Active Citizens Transform, founded in 2004 by Charles Secrett, former executive director of Friends of the Earth, and Ron Bailey.

On 8 February 2005, Charter 88 and the New Politics Network launched the Elect the Lords Campaign, which began with an advert in The Guardian newspaper.

It worked to introduce the Armed Forces (Parliamentary Approval for Participation in Armed Conflict) Bill in Parliament, in cooperation with Clare Short. In 2006, Active Citizens Transform was wound up and subsumed within Charter 88. Local Works, ACT's campaign for the Sustainable Communities Bill continued successfully and the legislation received Royal Assent in October 2007.

Members of Charter 88 and the New Politics Network were balloted in March 2007 on a proposed merger of the two organisations. The proposal was passed and the new organisation called Unlock Democracy was established in November 2007.

== See also ==
- Civil liberties in the United Kingdom
- Commonwealth of Britain Bill
- Elections in the United Kingdom
- Labour for a Republic
- Make Votes Matter
