= Unlock Democracy =

UK advocacy group

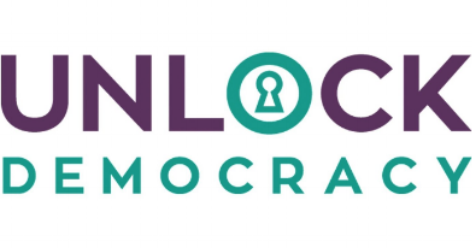
- Predecessor: Charter 88/New Politics Network
- Formation: 2007; 19 years ago
- Type: Non-governmental organisation
- Headquarters: London, United Kingdom
- Director: Tom Brake
- Website: unlockdemocracy.org.uk

Unlock Democracy is a British pressure group, based in London. The organisation campaigns for a more participatory democracy in Britain, founded upon a written constitution. Unlock Democracy works to promote democratic reform across the political spectrum and is not aligned with any political party. The organisation's activities include producing a range of publications, lobbying politicians and political parties and working on projects to promote greater public involvement in politics, at both local and national levels.

Unlock Democracy is led by a governing council, elected by all members biannually. The council in turn elects its own chair and a management board which oversees the day to day running of the organisation. It is funded from three main sources: grant income for specific projects from various foundations and trusts, subscriptions and donations from its members and supporters, and income from its subsidiary company Rodell Properties Ltd.

The founding director was Peter Facey, who was director of Unlock Democracy's predecessor organisation the New Politics Network in 2001, and later becoming director of Charter 88. He was responsible for the merger of the two organisations in 2007, creating Unlock Democracy. Being succeeded as director in 2013 by long-time Deputy Director Alexandra Runswick, who led the organisation until early 2020.

In October 2020, former Liberal Democrat MP Tom Brake was appointed as the new director of Unlock Democracy.

== History ==
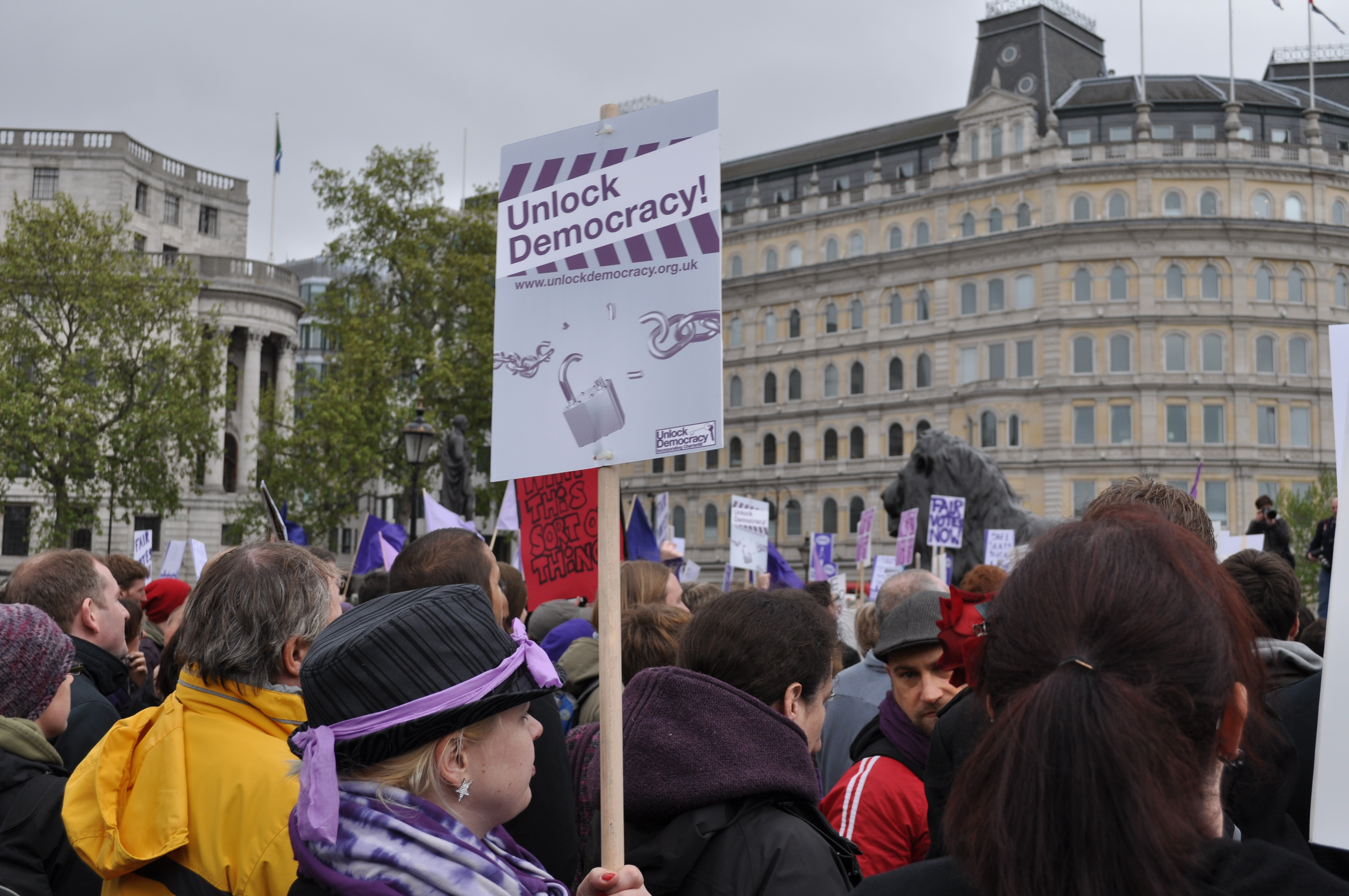
A demonstrator holding an Unlock Democracy sign in 2010

In 2003, 15 years after the formation of Charter 88, the organisation was experiencing a very turbulent period and this led to great organisational changes. A loss of intellectual contribution, the organisation's increasing financial woes and a period of resignations and redundancies created a near crisis situation in late 2003. In February 2005, Charter 88 and the New Politics Network (NPN) set up a joint working relationship to make the most of their resources in the establishment of the Elect the Lords campaign. The two organisations decided to formalise their working relationship in 2006, and Unlock Democracy was founded in 2007.

Members of Charter 88 (a pressure group advocating a charter of connected constitutional changes, including a written constitution, electoral reform, freedom of information, etc.) and NPN (the organisation established after the winding up of the think tank Democratic Left, which was itself the legal successor of the Communist Party of Great Britain) voted to merge the two organisations. The movement and subsequent campaigning of the organisation could be seen as remaining truer to its Charter 88 roots than those of the NPN. The NPN strapline, however, "connecting people and politics", was retained.

The merger was completed in November 2007.

== Campaign goals ==
Unlock Democracy argues for a "vibrant, inclusive democracy that puts power in the hands of the people". Its primary goal is the setting in place of a democratic participative process resulting in a written constitution. It is suggested that this constitution should explicitly enshrine;

- The separation of powers between the Executive, the Legislature and the Judiciary.
- The divisions and limitations of powers between central and local government within the UK.
- Basic liberties and human rights for all.

In addition to this, Unlock Democracy also campaigns;

- For fair and open elections
- For transparency in public decision making
- To ensure that power is exercised as closely to people as is practicable
- To empower individuals and their communities to have a greater say in over the decision that affect them
- For democratic accountability for all elected officials, government and public bodies
- For universal human rights for all

The Unlock Democracy constitution contains the charter (a set of aims set out by predecessor organisation Charter 88) as an appendix.

== Campaign activities ==
Unlock Democracy attends party conferences and runs external events such as People and Politics Day. It continues to work with and support other organisations such as Local Works on the Sustainable Communities Act. Lastly, it continues its work on democratic reform, including the Elect the Lords campaign, and the campaign for a review of the UK general election electoral system.

The May 2020 elections were postponed because of Covid until May 2021. In February 2021, with Covid still causing concerns, the UK government argued that leafleting by volunteers for the May 2021 elections was not allowed, but the commercial delivery of leaflets was. This was disadvantageous to the UK's smaller political parties, which rely more heavily on volunteers. Following a campaign by Big Brother Watch, Unlock Democracy and other campaign organisations, the UK government relented and allowed campaigning to take place from 8 March 2021.

In April 2021, ahead of the May 2021 Local elections. Unlock Democracy launched its Community Democracy campaign "Turning the Tide". As a part of this campaign, Unlock Democracy commissioned a report by De Montfort University on the state of local government in England over the past 40 years. The report, "Local Government in England – Forty Years of Decline", outlines how the autonomy, financial independence and democratic legitimacy of local government have all been weakened. It concludes that local government has been "hollowed out", that "Local Democracy is at breaking point", and that "urgent action is needed to restore it".

== Funding ==
Unlock Democracy has been given an A grade for funding transparency by Who Funds You?

== See also ==
- Make Votes Matter
- Electoral Reform Society
- Power 2010
- List of UK think tanks
- UK Parliament petitions website
- Elective dictatorship
