= Paul Boakye =

British writer, editor, campaigner, and marketing executive

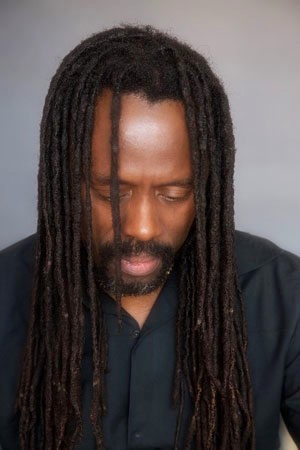
- Paul Boakye in 2016
- Born: 28 September 1963 (age 62); Tollington, London, England
- Education: Goldsmiths, University of London
- Known for: Writer, editor, campaigner, marketing executive, and entrepreneur

Paul Boakye is a British writer, editor, campaigner, and marketing executive. He is best known for his provocative drama, Boy with Beer, and for his work as editor and creator of Black Britain's premiere men's lifestyle magazine, DRUM.

== Early life ==
Paul moved to Jamaica with his father in 1966, returning to England after seven years. He attended Hollydale Primary School in Nunhead until 1975 and went to Sedgehill School for the next five years.

== Career ==
He was editor of DRUM magazine (2003–2005) and received a Creative and Life Writing master's degree at Goldsmiths, University of London. As a Commissioner for the Power Inquiry, he contributed to Power to the People, a report on the future of democracy in Britain debated in Parliament. He has been a guest speaker/broadcaster for radio and TV, as well as a regular newspaper reviewer on BBC Breakfast.

== Awards and recognition ==
Boakye has won the UK Student Playscript Award with Jacob's Ladder (1986) and the BBC Radio Drama Young Playwrights' Award with Hair (1991). His controversial stage play Boy with Beer is published by Methuen Drama in Black Plays 3 and is described as Britain's first black gay play. He is also the author of No Mean Street for Kuffdem and Red Ladder Theatre Company, Wicked Games produced by Leeds Playhouse, and the video drama Safe for Birmingham Health Authority and The Young Men's Video Project.

Boakye was invited to meet Queen Elizabeth II at Buckingham Palace in recognition of his sexual health promotion work with African communities in Britain, which has included editing a selection of ground-breaking health promotion publications.
