= Armed Forces (Parliamentary Approval for Participation in Armed Conflict) Bill =

British legislative attempt to limit royal intervention in warfare

Parliament of the United Kingdom
- Long title: A bill to require parliamentary approval for the participation of Her Majesty’s armed forces in armed conflict and for a declaration of war; and for connected purposes.
- Citation: Bill 16 of 2005–06
- Territorial extent: United Kingdom
- Considered by: House of Commons

Legislative history
- Introduced by: Clare Short
- First reading: 22 June 2005
- Second reading: 21 November 2005 (failed)

Keywords
- Declaration of war; Parliamentary approval; Royal prerogative
- Status: Not passed

Armed Forces (Parliamentary Approval for Participation in Armed Conflict) Bill was a bill of the Parliament of the United Kingdom. It attempted to limit the royal prerogative of declaring war by providing that only Parliament declare war or, except in certain emergencies, could sanction the United Kingdom's participation in armed conflicts.

== Passage through Parliament ==
Clare Short presented the bill to Parliament on 22 June 2005, supported by senior politicians from all three major parties including William Hague, Ken Clarke, Ming Campbell and Alex Salmond, and received its first reading. After publication, it received its second reading on 21 October 2005. It failed to pass the second reading, and move on to committee stage, because it was talked-out (discussed until there was no time left). A vote was cast but only 91 aye votes were cast and 12 no votes. A minimum of 100 aye votes are required for it to succeed.

It was argued by David Burrowes during the debate of the second reading that the bill was a "Trojan horse for voicing disapproval about going to war in Iraq".

Making his first speech to the House of Commons as Prime Minister, Gordon Brown proposed reforms which would have delivered the heart of this Bill. However no further action occurred.

== Provisions ==
In Parliament, a bill is divided into clauses. Clauses are further divided into sections. This bill drafted 11 clauses: clauses 1-3 defined prior approval, clauses 4-6 defined retrospective approval, clause 7 defined a declaration of war, and clauses 8-11 contained miscellaneous provisions.

=== Clause 1 - Prior approval: application ===
If the Prime Minister proposes that the British Armed Forces participate in an armed conflict, both Houses of Parliament must give permission otherwise it is unlawful. There are two exceptions under clause 4 and 6.

=== Clause 2 - Report relating to proposed participation ===
If the Prime Minister wishes to send the British Armed Forces into armed conflict, he must lay a report before both Houses of Parliament detailing:

- Why the United Kingdom should participate
- What legal authority they have to participate
- Where he expects the conflict to take place
- How long he expects the conflict to last
- Which parts of the British Armed Forces he expects to be involved

=== Clause 3 - Resolutions to approve proposed participation ===
Each House of Parliament shall agree by approving the report. The Prime Minister must bring the motion in the House of Commons.

=== Clause 4 - Participation in armed conflict in circumstances of urgency, etc. ===
This clause would apply if the British Armed Forces were in armed conflict before the bill was assented or where the Prime Minister decides to act as a matter of urgency and a report cannot be made in time. If the Prime Minister acts as a matter of urgency and Parliament is prorogued (not in session) for at least five days, then the Speaker of the House of Commons and the Lord Chancellor (now the Lord Speaker) shall meet within that five days. The Prime Minister will lay a report before both Houses as soon as is practicable.

=== Clause 5 - Resolutions to approve participation retrospectively ===
Both Houses will vote on the report as soon as is practicable.

=== Clause 6 - Provisions in case where resolution not come to ===
If either House of Parliament cannot decide within ten days or does not approve the report after ten days, then the Prime Minister has thirty days to withdraw the British Armed Forces or as long as it takes to remove them.

=== Clause 7 - Declaration of war ===
Only Parliament can declare war.

=== Clause 8 - Action in defence of members of the armed forces ===
Nothing in this act would stop a member of the British Armed Forces from following a lawful command or following established rules of engagement in order to take immediate defence.

=== Clause 9 - Prime Minister unable to act ===
If the Prime Minister cannot act, the Secretary of State can act in his stead.

=== Clause 10 - Interpretation ===
This clause sets interpretations.

=== Clause 11 - Short title and commencement ===
This clause defines the short title and the commencement date is enacted.

== See also ==
- Bill (law)
