= Diana Walford =

English physician and academic

Diana Marion Walford CBE FRCP (née Norton, born 26 February 1944) is an English physician and academic, who was principal of Mansfield College, Oxford, from 2002 until August 2011.

== Early and personal life ==
The daughter of Lieutenant-Colonel Joseph Norton and Thelma Norton, née Norton (sic), Walford was educated at Calder High School for Girls, the University of Liverpool (BSc, MB ChB, MD, George Holt Scholarship, George Holt Medal, J. Hill Abram Prize), and the London School of Hygiene and Tropical Medicine (MSc, N. and S. Devi Prize).

She married Arthur Walford on 9 December 1970. Arthur Walford is company secretary of Bupa.

== Career ==
Walford began her career as a house physician (1968–69) and house surgeon (1969) at Liverpool Royal Infirmary. She was then a senior house officer at St Mary's Hospital, London (1969–70) and Northwick Park Hospital (1970–71) and from 1972 until 1975 she was a senior registrar. She developed an interest in the blood disorder thalassaemia, and in 1975 she returned to Northwick Park Hospital as honorary senior registrar in the hospital's Clinical Research Centre while working as a research fellow at the North London Blood Transfusion Service, supported by the Medical Research Council. In the following year she took the first of many positions she was to hold in the Department of Health and Social Security. From 1976 until 1979 she was senior medical officer in the Medicines Division. She later became Principal Medical Officer in the Scientific Services Equipment Building Division (1979–83) and senior principal medical officer and under secretary in the Medical Manpower and Education Division (1983–86). She spent the academic year 1986–87 on sabbatical at the London School of Hygiene and Tropical Medicine. On her return to the Department of Health she took up her great post of senior principal medical officer and under secretary in the International Health Microbiology of Food and Water and Communicable Diseases Division. From 1989 until 1992 she was Deputy Chief Medical Officer of England and medical director of the NHS Management Executive. She was director of the Public Health Laboratory Service from 1993 until 2002, when she was appointed principal of Mansfield College, Oxford.

In 2021, she provided a statement for the Government's Infected Blood Inquiry.

== Honours and appointments ==
She became a Member of the Royal College of Physicians in 1972 and a Fellow in 1990, a Member of the Royal College of Pathologists in 1974 and a Fellow in 1986, and a Member of the Faculty of Public Health Medicine in 1989 and a Fellow in 1994.

On becoming principal of Mansfield College, Oxford she became a Master of Arts of the University of Oxford.

In 2002 HM The Queen appointed her Commander of the Most Excellent Order of the British Empire in the Birthday Honours List for services to public health.

Walford has been a member of the Court of Governors and of the board of management of the London School of Hygiene and Tropical Medicine. She is a governor of the Ditchley Foundation. She is the chair of the board of trustees of Regent's University London.

In 2025, she was appointed as the chair of the Board of Trustees of the Royal College of Physicians.

== Sources ==
- University of Oxford Annual Review
- 'New Principal for Mansfield', Oxford Blueprint: The newsletter of the University of Oxford 2:1 (4 October 2001)
- Dr Diana Walford, Director of the PHLS, elected to Principalship of Mansfield College, Oxford (Health Protection Agency press release, 6 September 2001)
- Debrett's People of Today (12th edn, London: Debrett's Peerage, 1999), p. 2021
