= Clive Wedderburn =

English actor (born 1967)

- Born: 10 January 1967 (age 59); Reading, Berkshire, UK
- Education: East 15 Acting School
- Occupation: Actor
- Years active: 1986–present

Clive Wedderburn (born 10 January 1967) is an English actor best known for his role as PC Gary McCann in The Bill.

He was born in Reading, Berkshire in 1967. In 1972, his parents moved to Birmingham, where he was to spend the next 13 years before moving to London to train as an actor at East 15 Acting School. He went on to enjoy a colourful acting career, performing on stage at the Royal National Theatre and the Royal Court Theatre.

Between 2004 and 2007, Wedderburn played Sway Holloway in the BBC's radio soap opera Silver Street, broadcast on BBC Asian Network.

== Selected credits ==
- The Bill as PC Gary McCann (1992–2000)
- Silent Witness: "Mind and Body" (2005) as Jack Harvey
- Silver Street as Sway Holloway (2004–2007)
- Rev. as PC Ferguson (2010)
- Coronation Street as Dr Cole (2011)
