= New Politics Network =

British think tank

- Predecessor: Democratic Left
- Successor: Unlock Democracy
- Formation: December 1998
- Dissolved: November 2007
- Type: Think tank, campaign group
- Legal status: Dissolved
- Headquarters: 6 Cynthia Street, Islington, London, N1 9JF
- Region served: United Kingdom
- Members: 200–250
- Director: Peter Facey (final); Nina Temple (first)
- Website: new-politics.net (defunct)

The New Politics Network (NPN) was a British think tank and campaign group that operated from 1999 to 2007. Founded as the successor to Democratic Left, which was itself the legal successor to the Communist Party of Great Britain, the NPN focused on democratic renewal, constitutional reform, and cross-party political participation.

The organisation had approximately 200-250 members and was governed by an elected Council. Its campaigns included advocacy for proportional representation, House of Lords reform, and lowering the voting age to 16. The NPN also conducted research on electoral practices and political participation, including what it described as the largest UK-wide study of election literature during the 2005 United Kingdom general election. Major collaborative efforts included the "Elect the Lords" campaign with Charter 88 and the European Citizenship Project.

A 2000 New Statesman report indicated the NPN owned assets worth £3.5 million, derived from former Soviet subsidies to the Communist Party. In 2007, the organisation merged with Charter 88 to form Unlock Democracy, with the NPN contributing substantial financial resources to the merger.

== Origin ==
The NPN was established in December 1999 following the dissolution of Democratic Left, the legal successor organisation to the Communist Party of Great Britain. Nina Temple served as its first director. Prior to becoming the NPN, Democratic Left had briefly operated as the New Times Network, publishing a magazine titled New Times until summer 1999.

The NPN positioned itself as politically independent, committed to working across the political spectrum and collaborating with individuals from all the main political parties. This approach marked a departure from the ideologically focused stance of Democratic Left and its Communist Party heritage.

== Organisation and membership ==
The NPN operated as a democratic organisation with approximately 200-250 members. According to its constitution, membership was open to people from "any part of the world and many political traditions," including socialism, liberalism, anti-oppression movements and environmentalism. Membership fees were set at £6 minimum or £25 recommended. Governance was provided by an elected Council with gender-balanced representation that met at least four times per year in different locations across the country.

The organisation allowed members to participate in autonomous local groups and networks based on location, shared identity, or common interests. These groups were financially independent and established their own objectives while adhering to the NPN's broader aims and values. The NPN maintained non-party status, permitting members to stand as candidates for their own parties or as independents, but not under the New Politics Network banner.

== Aims and values ==
According to its constitution, the NPN's stated purpose was to "reconnect politics to people" and create "open spaces in which to deepen democracy, reskill the political process and rekindle enthusiasm for democracy". The organisation's stated aims included contributing to constitutional reform such as proportional representation for all elections, strengthening local government, establishing regional assemblies, and creating a written constitution. Additional stated aims included deepening dialogue about European integration, supporting the trade union movement, addressing social exclusion and poverty, and promoting environmental and cooperative movements.

The organisation's constitution listed values including democracy, empowerment, equality, solidarity, sustainability, and universal human rights, with the stated goal to "negotiate constructively the tensions between these interlocking values". The organisation's constitutional vision described a society that "meets the basic needs of all", is "free from oppression and exploitation", has "democratic politics and institutions designed to involve citizens", and contributes to "a new global community of co-operation and interdependence".

== Activities ==
The NPN worked with various groups and individuals to facilitate discussion of emerging political ideas. According to its constitution, the organisation aimed to provide independent debate on the future of politics. It published regular bulletins to encourage networking and skills sharing among activists, and organised Open Forums alongside Council meetings that served as what it termed "a market place of ideas and experiences". In partnership with the Joseph Rowntree Reform Trust, the NPN funded the tactical voting website Tacticalvoter.net during the 2001 United Kingdom general election, though it was not involved in the similarly named 2005 campaign.

=== Campaigns and initiatives ===
The NPN coordinated several campaigns and initiatives during its existence. The "Elect the Lords" campaign, conducted jointly with Charter 88, advocated for replacing the House of Lords with a predominantly elected second chamber. This campaign received support from organisations including the Electoral Reform Society, Progress and Conservatives for Change.

The organisation operated a European Citizenship Project, an educational initiative that examined European Union citizenship and the proposed EU Constitution. Through "The Democracy Project," a strategic partnership with Charter 88, both organisations collaborated on democratic renewal issues including House of Lords reform, European citizenship, active citizenship, and devolution and local governance.

Additional initiatives included Party Watch, a database documenting political donations and donor information; the "Votes at 16" campaign promoting the lowering of the voting age to 16 in all public elections; and participation in the Make Votes Count coalition for electoral reform, where the NPN's director chaired the grassroots committee.

=== Research projects ===
In 2005, the NPN conducted a UK-wide review of election literature during the 2005 General Election, which the organisation described as the "largest ever" such study. The project, funded by the Joseph Rowntree Reform Trust, involved 312 volunteers in 223 constituencies who recorded all political party contacts, collecting 3,459 different leaflets and logging doorstep contacts and telephone calls.

According to the research, analysed by Dr Justin Fisher of Brunel University, doorstep and telephone contact was low (2 in 5 respondents were contacted), negative campaigning was more common in marginal seats, and Conservative Party focus on immigration and asylum issues was less prominent than commonly asserted. Director Peter Facey stated that "voters in the least marginal constituencies were largely ignored" and questioned whether politicians were "actually engaging with citizens at all".

=== Political party reform advocacy ===
The NPN participated in debates about political party reform and democratic participation. In September 2005, the organisation wrote an open letter to the Conservative Party's National Convention opposing proposals to abolish One Member, One Vote rules for leadership elections.

In the open letter, Director Peter Facey contended that restricting voting to the Parliamentary Party would result in leadership selection by a group he characterised as "overwhelmingly white, male and from the South of England", and proposed "primary-style" elections involving Conservative-supporting members of the public. The organisation argued that such reforms would require leadership contenders to engage with "the public at large" rather than conduct "a conversation with itself", which it claimed would help recruit new activists and focus debate on "what is good for the country".

In 2000, Nick Cohen wrote in the New Statesman predicting that the NPN would merge with Make Votes Count and Charter 88. At the 2003 AGM, Nina Temple and others attempted to steer the organisation toward its democratic socialist origins. Had this succeeded, the organisation might have joined the Compass pressure group.

The NPN was based at 6 Cynthia Street, Islington, London. According to a 2000 report by Nick Cohen in the New Statesman, the organisation owned assets worth £3.5 million, including a four-storey office building in Islington, a property company called Rodell, and a former party office in the Midlands. These assets were reported to have originated from Soviet subsidies to the Communist Party of Great Britain.

== Merger ==
In November 2007, the NPN, then directed by Peter Facey, merged with Charter 88 to form Unlock Democracy. The NPN's contribution to this merger was primarily financial, reflecting Charter 88's difficult financial situation. The NPN's slogan "connecting people and politics" was retained by the new organisation.

== See also ==
- List of UK think tanks
- Make Votes Matter
