= Wakeham Report =

A House for the Future, known as the Wakeham Report, published in 2000, was the report of a Royal Commission headed by Lord Wakeham, concerning reform of the House of Lords.

== Recommendations of the report ==
In its 217-page report, A House for the Future, issued in January 2000, the commission made 132 recommendations that it described as a blueprint for "radical evolutionary change" of the House of Lords for better government. Of these, major recommendations included the following:

- The membership of the House of Lords should be reduced to around 550.
- A majority of the House (every member except for the regional members, lords of appeal, and Church of England representatives) should be appointed by an independent Honours and Appointments Commission, rather than by the Prime Minister; this would reduce the role of the House as a source of political patronage. The Honours and Appointments Commission would consist of eight members (three from the major political parties, one nominated by crossbenchers, and four independents), appointed under the Nolan principles and with a term limit of 10 years. The commission's appointees would maintain crossbench representation at about 20%.
- A minority of members (between 60 and 195) should be elected on a regional basis, through proportional representation. Three different models were proposed, with varying numbers of elected members; under all three models, members were to serve for terms of "three electoral cycles" or 15 years.
- With respect to representation of religious groups, a substantial majority of the Commission believed that "Representation should be extended beyond the Church of England to embrace other Christian denominations in all parts of the United Kingdom and representatives of other faiths."
- Ministers should be accountable to the House of Lords as well as the House of Commons.
- The few remaining hereditary peers should be removed.
- Persons raised to the peerage through the honours lists would not be members of the House.
- Members of the reformed House would not longer be called peers.
- There would be "no significant changes in the second chamber's law-making functions" or the balance of power between the Commons and Lords. The reformed House of Lords would retain a "suspensory veto" (the power to delay, but not to block, a bill approved by the Commons in two successive parliamentary sessions). The Salisbury Convention would be maintained.
- There was "insufficient reason to change the present arrangements" with respect to the judicial functions of the House of Lords, and there was "some advantage in having senior judges" be members of the House.

The Commission explicitly recommended against a wholly or predominantly elected chamber or selection of members by random selection, co-option, or indirect election from devolved institutions, local governments, or British members of the European Parliament (MEPs).

== Criticisms of the report ==
The report has been criticised for not addressing some crucial issues. For instance, at present, the House of Lords only has a power of suspensive veto; they may only delay legislation for one year, after which the House of Commons may pass it without the Lords' assent. The report did not address whether this situation would change, or remain the same.

The report was criticised that it proposed that the Lords' ability to veto subordinated and delegated legislation should be replaced by a three-month delaying power to make clear that the Lords is the Second Chamber.

Another important criticism of the report's recommendations is that adding some elected members to the House might create two 'classes' of members; the elected members might be seen as having greater democratic legitimacy and authority than the appointed members. This could also threaten the traditional primacy of the House of Commons within the Westminster parliamentary system. One commentator, the Liberal Democrat peer Lord McNally, wrote in January 2000: "Those who fear that a House of Lords with increased authority will challenge the status of the Commons and cause constitutional conflict - or "gridlock" as the Americans call it when the Senate and the House of Representatives disagree - will worry that the Wakeham proposals set us on just that course. On the other hand, those who believe that the second chamber must have the full democratic mandate which only the ballot box can bestow will be disappointed."

Others were dissatisfied with the Wakeham Commission's refusal to remove appointed members; according to BBC political correspondent Nick Assinder, "opponents accused the commission of failing to come up with a single, simple recommendation and allowing the creation of chamber of "Tony's Cronies"".

Some critics argued that the report would result in the Lords becoming in effect a weak advisory council for the House of Commons, which would lead to excessive conflict between the few elected members and the mainly appointed members.

== Impact ==
Only a few of the Wakeham Report's 132 recommendations were ever adopted.
