= Charles Secrett =

British environmental activist, author and broadcaster

Charles Secrett is an environmental activist and was head of Friends of the Earth England, Wales and Northern Ireland in 1993–2003. He is an author and broadcaster on environmental topics.

Secrett was a member of the Labour Government's Commission for Sustainable Development, and sits on the Advisory Boards for The Ecologist magazine, the Environmental Law Foundation in Britain and the Environment Programme of the University of North Carolina in the United States.

In 1999, The Observer newspaper ranked him the 36th most influential person in Britain in its annual Power 300 List and in 2000, he was ranked 200th.

Secrett has also campaigned against nuclear power and prior to the 2015 general election, he was one of several celebrities who endorsed the parliamentary candidacy of the Green Party's Caroline Lucas.

In April 2026, an article posted by The Guardian about the controversial proscription of Palestine Action as a terrorist group within the UK, states that Secrett has criticised defining "Palestine Action and its supporters as terrorists", and said: "(George) Orwell warned that the first step towards tyranny is the abuse and misuse of language by an authoritarian government."

== Positions held ==
- Vice President – London Wildlife Trust (2006 – current)
- Member – London Development Agency Board; Chair – LDA Health and Sustainability Advisory Group (2004 – current)
- Chair – Triodos Bank Renewable Energy Fund Board (2004 – current)
- Member – Environmental Law Foundation Advisory Board (2002 – current)
- Trustee – The Building Exploratory Board, Hackney (2004 – current)
- Ambassador – Renewable World (2015 – current)
- Executive Director – Friends of the Earth England, Wales and Northern Ireland (1993 – 2003)
- Member – UK Roundtable on Sustainable Development and UK Sustainable Development Commission (1993 – 2003)
- University of North Carolina, John Motley Morehead Scholarship; B.A. English and American Literature – Hons. (1972 – 77)

== See also ==
- Environmentalism
- Individual and political action on climate change
