= Joseph Rowntree Charitable Trust =

Philanthropic trust based in York, England

- Registration no.: 210037
- Headquarters: York, England
- Location: The Garden House, Water End
- Chair of Trustees: Huw Davies
- Website: www.jrct.org.uk

The Joseph Rowntree Charitable Trust (JRCT) is a philanthropic grant-making trust that supports work undertaken in the UK and Ireland, and previously South Africa. It is one of three original trusts set up by Joseph Rowntree in 1904. The Trust supports work in five programme areas: peace and security, rights and justice, power and accountability, sustainable future and Northern Ireland.

== History ==
In 1904, the Joseph Rowntree Charitable Trust (JRCT), along with sister organisations the Joseph Rowntree Foundation and the Joseph Rowntree Reform Trust, were created by Joseph Rowntree, who gave about a half of his wealth to establish them. The original trustees of the JRCT were: Rowntree, his sons John Wilhelm, Benjamin Seebohm, Joseph Stephenson and Oscar Frederick, and his nephew Arnold Stephenson Rowntree. The Joseph Rowntree Charitable Trust's values are rooted in Quakerism. Joseph Rowntree, who was a Quaker, believed that it is only possible to make a lasting difference by addressing the root causes of a social or economic problem. Quaker values include peace, equality, simplicity, integrity and stewardship of the earth.

== Current day ==
The Joseph Rowntree Charitable Trust describes itself as "a Quaker trust which seeks to transform the world by supporting people who address the root causes of conflict and injustice."

The Trust says that in order to engage in philanthropy that effects real change, "JRCT does not shy away from supporting those working on unpopular or contentious issues". It also believes that change can "take many years to achieve". The Joseph Rowntree Charitable Trust offers grants to around 100 different charitable organisations a year. In 2018 these included Reprieve, Fawcett Society, Operation Black Vote and Fair Tax Mark. It makes grants in excess of £10 million a year.

=== Cage controversy ===
The Joseph Rowntree Charitable Trust said it works to "strengthen the hands of those leading change" and recognises that such work carries a level of risk.

Between 2007 and 2011, the trust gave three grants to CAGE, formerly known as Cageprisoners, described as a "controversial Islamic rights group", totalling £305,000, to support the work of Moazzam Begg.

Cage describes itself as "an independent organisation working to empower communities impacted by the War on Terror" and has spoken out against the UK's anti-terrorism laws.

CAGE spokesman Asim Qureshi called on Muslims to support jihad at an extremist rally, and described militant Mohammed Emwazi, as a "beautiful young man". Lord Carlile, formerly the British Government's independent reviewer of anti-terrorism legislation, said: "I would never advise anybody to give money to CagePrisoners. I have concerns about the group. There are civil liberty organisations which I do give money to but CagePrisoners is most certainly not one of them."

Speaking in 2015, the human rights lawyer Clive Stafford Smith defended the "vital" work of Cage and denied they are apologists for terrorism. He said: "They do important work and the UK authorities need to understand that alienating moderate Muslims is the worst thing that could possibly be done at this time. I myself represent those said to be 'terrorists' and since Magna Carta, in 1215, we have presumed people innocent rather than guilty…it is clear beyond dispute that when we jettison our principles we make ourselves hypocrites and hypocrisy is the yeast that ferments extremism."

In October 2015, following an application for judicial review by Cage, the Charity Commission said it would not in future interfere in the discretion of charities to choose to fund Cage. The judicial review heard evidence that Theresa Villiers, a British Cabinet Minister, and US intelligence had both applied pressure on the charity commission to investigate Cage, with US intelligence agents describing Cage as a "jihadist front".

=== Ethical investment ===
The Joseph Rowntree Charitable Trust invests its endowment sustainably and responsibly. It does not invest in the arms industry, gambling, the tobacco industry or nuclear power. The Trust has also divested from fossil fuel extractive companies. In 2019 it was among a coalition of 20 charities which asked the attorney-general and the Charity Commission for England and Wales to seek a ruling on whether the public benefit of charities means they should be required to align their investment policies with their own objectives and commitments to wider society.

In September 2019, JRCT was named a "global leader" by the UN-supported Principles for Responsible Investment for its commitment to ethical and responsible investment. The global leader group also included the Church Commissioners for England and the Environmental Agency Pension Fund.
