= Rowntree trusts =

Four trusts created by the Rowntree family

The four Rowntree Trusts are funded from the legacies of the Quaker chocolate entrepreneurs and social reformers Joseph Rowntree and Benjamin Seebohm Rowntree. The trusts are based in the Rowntrees' home city of York, England. The trusts are:

- the Joseph Rowntree Charitable Trust, a Quaker philanthropic trust;
- the Joseph Rowntree Foundation (until 1968, named the Joseph Rowntree Memorial Trust), which funds social policy research and development;
- the Joseph Rowntree Housing Trust (formed in 1968 to take over the housing operations of the Joseph Rowntree Memorial Trust), which owns and manages the model village of New Earswick, and a number of other housing schemes in the York area;
- the Joseph Rowntree Reform Trust (until 1990, named the Joseph Rowntree Social Service Trust), which is a political body and promotes democratic reform and social justice within the UK. Unlike the other three, it is not a charity, though it endowed the JRSST Charitable Trust.

== See also ==
- List of UK think tanks
