= Reform of the House of Lords =

Proposed reforms to the upper house of the British Parliament

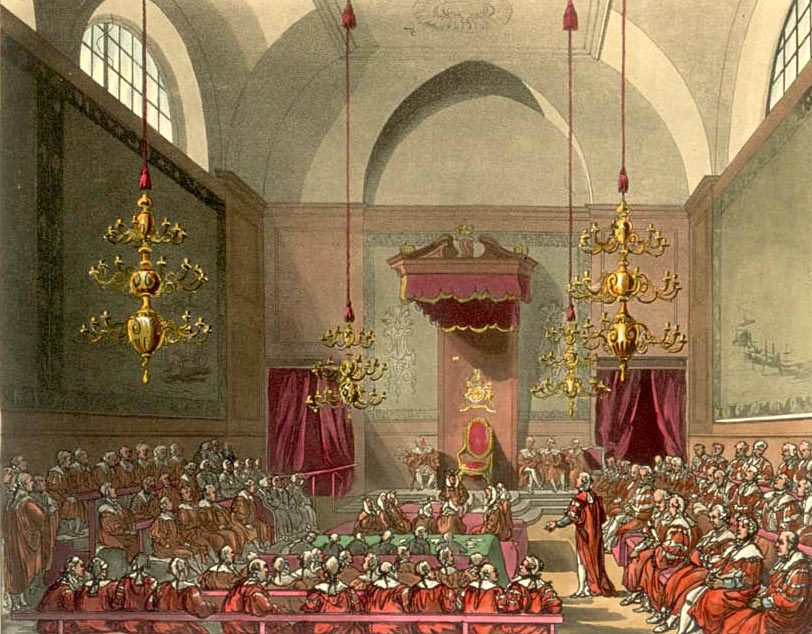
The House of Lords Chamber as drawn by Augustus Pugin and Thomas Rowlandson for Ackermann's Microcosm of London (1808–1812)

Reform of the House of Lords, the upper house of the Parliament of the United Kingdom, has been a topic of discussion in UK politics for more than a century. Multiple governments have attempted reform, beginning with the introduction of the Parliament Act 1911 by the incumbent Liberal Government. When the Labour Party came to power in the 1997 general election, the Blair government passed the House of Lords Act 1999. On 7 November 2001 the government undertook a public consultation. This helped to create a public debate on the issue of Lords reform, with 1,101 consultation responses and multiple debates in Parliament and the media. However, no consensus on the future of the upper chamber emerged.

All three of the main parties promised to take action on Lords reform in the 2010 general election, and following it the Coalition Agreement included a promise to "establish a committee to bring forward proposals for a wholly or mainly elected upper chamber on the basis of proportional representation". Deputy Prime Minister Nick Clegg introduced the House of Lords Reform Bill 2012 on 27 June 2012 which built on proposals published on 17 May 2011. However, this Bill was abandoned by the Government on 6 August 2012 following opposition from within the Conservative Party. A successful attempt to pursue minor reform of the House was made on 14 May 2014 when the House of Lords Reform Act 2014 gained Royal Assent.

== History of reform ==
=== Reform and reform attempts before 1997 ===
The Liberal Government elected in 1910 included a preamble in the Parliament Act 1911:

... whereas it is intended to substitute for the House of Lords as it at present exists a Second Chamber constituted on a popular instead of hereditary basis, but such substitution cannot be immediately brought into operation

— Parliament Act 1911

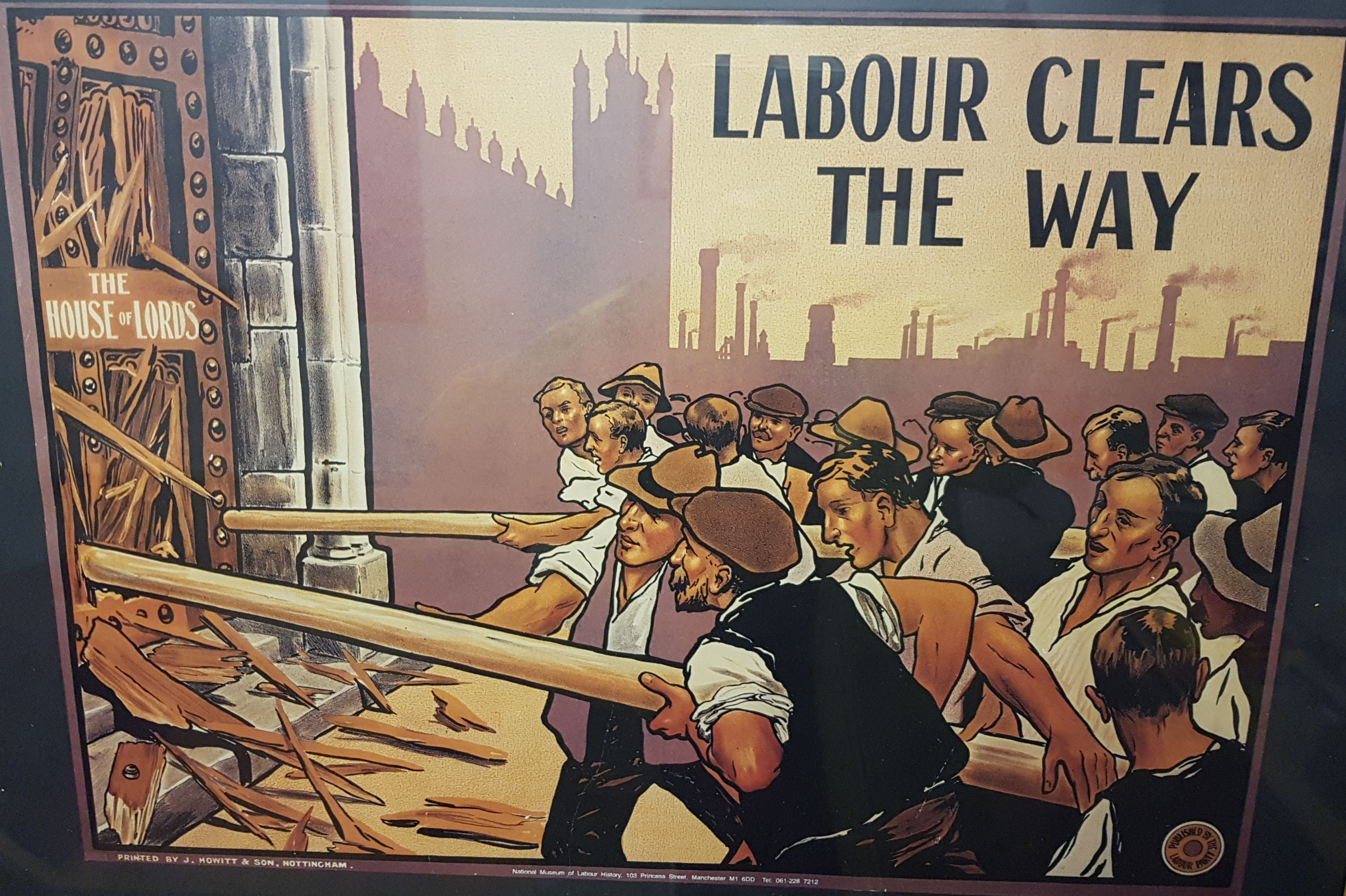
Labour Party campaign poster from 1910

The Parliament Act 1911 removed the ability of the House of Lords to veto money bills; with any other bills, the House of Commons was given powers to overrule the Lords' veto after two changes of parliamentary session and two years. In 1917 the Bryce Commission was set up to consider House of Lords reform proposals. The commission's recommendations were rejected by a vote in the House of Lords. The Parliament Act 1949, however, amended the 1911 act reducing the time the Lords could delay a bill from two sessions and two years to one session and one year.

The Salisbury Convention is an unwritten constitutional convention that the Commons, as the elected chamber, has a mandate to pass anything in the government party's manifesto without the Lords' veto. This was necessary as the Conservative Party had an absolute majority in the House of Lords, and it was seen as inappropriate for them to use this to block the Labour government's policies following their landslide victory in 1945. The Life Peerages Act 1958 enabled the appointment of a new class of peers, who could sit and vote in the House of Lords, but the honour and rights would not be hereditary. These were intended to be merit-based, letting in "the great and the good" from various backgrounds of expertise and experience and ending the exclusively hereditary (and exclusively male) composition. Since 1965, almost all peerages appointed have been life peerages. However, the system has come under criticism in 'cash for honours' scandals in which those who donate significant sums to political parties may be able to gain membership of the House of Lords, undermining its credibility as a revising chamber. The Peerage Act 1963 allowed hereditary peers to disclaim their peerage, allowing them to vote and stand for elections to the House of Commons. It also permitted hereditary peers in the Peerage of Scotland and female hereditary peers to sit in the House of Lords without the election of Scottish representative peers as had been the procedure in Scotland prior to the Act.

==== Parliament (No. 2) Bill 1968–69 ====
In 1968, Harold Wilson's Labour Government published a white paper on reform of the House of Lords. The main proposals made in the white paper were:

- Life peers, created hereditary peers and 16 bishops would have been able to be voting members of the House, if they attended at least one third of the sittings and were under 72 years old at the start of a new parliament. The number of bishops would have been decreased from 26 to 16 through retirements.
- Hereditary peers by succession sitting at the time would have remained as non-voting members with all other rights of a member. Their heirs would have been excluded from future membership.
- The sitting government would have got a right to a majority of those voting members of the House who have a party affiliation, but not an overall majority of all voting members.
- The right of the House to delay a bill would have been reduced from one year to six months.

The Parliament (No. 2) Bill, which embodied proposals of the white paper, was introduced in December 1968. The Prime Minister announced in April 1969 that the Government would not proceed with the bill.

=== Powers as of the 1997 general election ===
Originally, the two Houses of Parliament had equal legislative powers. The agreement of both was necessary before a bill could be submitted to the Monarch for royal assent, which if granted made the bill an Act of Parliament. After the English Restoration, a constitutional convention arose that the House of Lords would defer to the House of Commons on measures to raise and spend money. The Parliament Act 1911 divided Bills into three classes.

1. Money bills which, failing consent from the Lords within one month, could receive royal assent without it.
2. Other bills on which the House of Lords could exercise a suspensory veto.
3. On any bill extending the maximum term of Parliament beyond five years, the House of Lords retained equal legislative powers.

Together with the Parliament Act 1949, these two acts enable the Commons (in exceptional circumstance) to pass legislation without approval from the Lords but subject to certain time delays. In effect, they give the House of Lords the power to delay legislation but not to prevent it. Since 1911 there have been various attempts to reform the Lords, but none tackled the powers of the House except the Parliament Act 1949 which reduced the suspensory veto to one change of session and one year. By the time of the 1997 general election there was still no consensus on comprehensive reform of the upper chamber of Parliaments.

=== Blair Labour government ===
The Labour Party of Tony Blair had in its manifesto the promise to reform the House of Lords:

The House of Lords must be reformed. As an initial, self-contained reform, not dependent on further reform in the future, the right of hereditary Peers to sit and vote in the House of Lords will be ended by statute ...

— Labour Party, Labour Party Manifesto 1997, p32–33

In 1999, the Government completed a deal with the Lords to remove most of the hereditary peers and passed the House of Lords Act 1999, leaving amongst the majority of appointed peers a rump of 92 hereditary peers. Of these, two are ex officio members due to their ceremonial functions in Parliament, and the other 90 are chosen from among those with qualifying hereditary peerages, in a procedure established by standing orders of the House. This arrangement was stated to be purely temporary until the second stage of reform was completed. This led to some claims (perhaps not all serious) that the elected hereditary peers were the only democratic members of the House.

==== Royal Commission ====
In 1999 a Royal Commission was appointed, under Lord Wakeham, to examine proposals for Lords reform and make recommendations. It published its report in 2000 with 132 recommendations of which the main were:

- It should have around 550 members of which 65, 87 or 195 should be elected regional members.
- There should be an independent Appointments Commission responsible for all appointments.
- The new second chamber should have the capacity to offer counsel from a range of sources. It should be broadly representative of society in the United Kingdom at the beginning of the 21st century. It should work with the House of Commons to provide an effective check upon the Government. It should give the United Kingdom's constituent nations and regions, for the first time, a formally constituted voice in the Westminster Parliament.
- The Commons should be the principal political forum, should have the final say in respect of all major public policy issues, including those expressed in the form of proposed legislation. The second chamber should have sufficient power, and the associated authority, to require the Government and the House of Commons to reconsider proposed legislation and take account of any cogent objections to it.
- The House of Lords should contain a substantial proportion of people who are not professional politicians, who have continuing experience in a range of different walks of life and who can bring a broad range of expertise to bear on issues of public concern. Representation of the reformed second chamber should match that of the country as expressed in votes cast at the most recent general election but it should not be capable of being dominated by any one political party and continue to include people who can help it to maintain a philosophical, moral or spiritual perspective on public policy issues.
- Possession of a peerage should no longer be a necessary qualification for membership.
- Provisions should be in place to permit ministers to be drawn from the Upper House.
- The upper House should ensure that changes to the constitution are not made without full and open debate and that there is increased scrutiny of secondary legislation.
- The commission could not recommend: a wholly or largely directly elected second chamber; indirect election from the devolved institutions (or local government electoral colleges) or from among British MEPs; random selection; or co-option.

In a debate in the House of Lords on 7 March 2000, Baroness Jay of Paddington expressed the government's broad acceptance of the commission's report:

The Government accept the principles underlying the main elements of the Royal Commission's proposals on the future role and structure of this House, and will act on them. That is, we agree that the Second Chamber should clearly be subordinate, largely nominated but with a minority elected element and with a particular responsibility to represent the regions. We agree there should be a statutory appointments commission ...

On 4 May 2000 the Prime Minister announced the membership of a non-statutory Appointments Commission. In the debate in the Commons on 19 June 2000 the Government announced the establishment of a Joint Committee of both houses to consider the Royal Commission's work. But in a written reply on 6 March 2001 the Government stated there was little prospect of a Joint Committee being established in the present Parliament due to a failure of cross-party discussions. On 26 April 2001 the Queen confirmed her intention to create 15 new non-party-political members of the House of Lords termed "People's Peers". In the May 2001 general election, all three main parties included statements on House of Lords reform in their manifestos.

==== White paper and first consultation ====
On 7 November 2001, the government launched a white paper and consultation stating:

A credible and effective second chamber is vital to the health of Britain's democracy ... The Government is determined to proceed with this wider reform of the House of Lords. The Royal Commission offered an excellent way forward and the Government has a clear electoral mandate to undertake it. Our mission is to equip the British people with a Parliament and a constitution fit for the 21st century. A reformed second chamber has an indispensable role to play, and this White Paper prepares the way for its introduction.

In the white paper, although the government said it "strongly endorsed" the Royal Commission's views, it listed its own proposals:

- The remaining 92 hereditary peers were to be removed, the number of peers to be capped after 10 years at 600 and 120 members to be elected to represent the nations and the regions.
- It was to include a significant minority of independent members. Its political membership should be broadly representative of the main parties' relative voting strengths as reflected in the previous general election. Membership was to be separated from the peerage which would continue as an honour. There should be increased representation of women and those from ethnic minority backgrounds. No group in society should in future have privileged hereditary access to the House.
- The House of Lords would remain subject to the pre-eminence of the House of Commons in discharging its functions; its principal function should continue to be to consider and revise legislation, to scrutinise the executive, and to debate and report on public issues.
- The statutory Appointments Commission would manage the balance and size of the House, appoint the independent members, and to assure the integrity of those nominated by political parties.

===== First public consultation =====
The white paper invited comments from interested parties stating the government intended to introduce legislation "incorporating decisions on the issues raised in the consultation" and listed the following as the main points of consultation:

- The overall balance between elected, nominated and ex officio members, and the balance between political and independent members;
- Whether elections to the Lords should be linked to general elections, those for the European Parliament, or over time linked to those from devolved and regional bodies within the UK;
- The length of term for elected members;
- The term of appointment;
- What grounds should lead to statutory expulsion from the House;
- Whether there should be a change from an expenses-based system of remuneration.

The result was that an unprecedented 1101 submissions were made to the consultation and both the Conservative and Liberal Democrat parties published their own proposals during the consultation in January 2002. In May 2002, the Government published a statistical analysis. The Government proposed to establish a Joint Committee on House of Lords Reform to try to take matters forward and achieve a consensus.

==== Votes of February 2003 ====
On 11 December 2002, the Joint Committee published its first report, which set out "an inclusive range of seven options for the composition of a reformed House of Lords". In January 2003, the Houses of Lords and Commons debated the report. The debate in the Lords was dominated by contributors arguing for a fully appointed House, so much so that Lord Irvine of Lairg stated:

Plainly, the dominant view of this House expressed over the past two days is in favour of an all-appointed House.

On 29 January 2003, then Prime Minister Tony Blair added his own support to a fully appointed House by arguing against the creation of a hybrid House. On 4 February 2003, the Commons and House of Lords voted on the seven options proposed by the joint committee and the Commons also voted on an amendment to abolish the upper house completely:

Results of parliamentary votes, 4 February 2003
Option		Lords		Commons	
Elected	Appointed	Contents	Not-Contents	Aye	No
0%	100%	335	110	245	323
20%	80%	39	375	–	–
40%	60%	60	358	–	–
50%	50%	84	322	–	–
60%	40%	91	317	253	316
80%	20%	93	338	281	284
100%	0%	106	329	272	289
Abolition		–	–	172	390

After this series of votes, where the Commons failed to back a single option and the Lords only a fully appointed House, Robin Cook, the leader of the Commons, said:

We should go home and sleep on this interesting position. That is the most sensible thing that anyone can say in the circumstances. As the right honourable Gentleman knows, the next stage in the process is for the Joint Committee to consider the votes in both Houses. Heaven help the members of the Committee, because they will need it.

With widely differing views in the Joint Committee, its report on 9 May 2003 effectively passed the initiative back to the Government. But nine members of the Joint Committee issued a statement coinciding with the publication which stated:

Since the House of Commons rejected the option of a fully appointed Second Chamber by a large majority on 4th February it would be absurd and unacceptable to introduce legislation which would have that effect. Simply evicting the hereditary peers, and placing the appointments process on a statutory basis, would result in that soundly rejected option. Those who argue that the Commons must remain predominant – including Ministers – should surely respect the outcome of that vote by MPs.

==== Creation of the Department for Constitutional Affairs ====
In June 2003, Tony Blair announced the creation of a new department to oversee constitutional change with Lord Falconer of Thoroton as its first Secretary of State. The department was tasked with:

- Establishment of an independent Judicial Appointments Commission.
- Creation of a new Supreme Court to replace the existing system of Law Lords operating as a committee of the House of Lords.
- Reform of the Speakership of the House of Lords.
- New arrangements for the conduct of Scottish and Welsh business.

When in 2003 Lord Falconer of Thoroton signalled the government's preference for an all appointed House of Lords, three members of the Liberal Democrats issued a statement:

We, together with other members of the committee, issued a statement at the same time stating our belief that the committee could not continue to act in the absence of an indication of the government's preferred route to achieve its manifesto commitment to a more representative and democratic House of Lords.

Ministers responded, saying:

We cannot accept the removal of the remaining hereditary peers on its own, but only as part of much wider measures of reform to create a democratic and accountable second chamber. ... We therefore see no role which the joint committee can usefully play in achieving the reformed House of Lords which we seek.

==== Second public consultation ====
In September 2003, the Department for Constitutional Affairs issued Constitutional Reform: Next Steps for the House of Lords, which gave as its main proposals:

- A fully appointed House of Lords
- Removal of the remaining 92 hereditary peers
- Establishment of a statutory independent Appointments Commission accountable to Parliament which would determine numbers and timings of appointments, select independent members of the House to oversee party nominations

The paper also started a second consultation, on the Appointments Commission for the House of Lords requesting submissions on how the Appointments Commission itself would be appointed, even though no other alternatives to an appointed Commission had been considered. Reaction to the paper was hostile: for example, Lord Goodhart, the Liberal Democrat spokesperson on Constitutional Affairs, said "the overwhelming reaction I have is a feeling of contempt and betrayal".

On 18 March 2004 (before the statistical analysis had been published), the BBC reported that the government would not proceed with legislation to enact the proposals in the consultation. Although this suggested a lack of support for their proposals from the consultation, when the statistical analysis was published on 22 April 2004 the report stated that on the main issue (2a):

87 percent of respondents dealing with issue 2 (a) were in favour of a Commission composed of representatives of the three main political parties and the cross-benchers and a number of independently appointed members.

With such an apparently high level of support, it is unclear why the government chose not to proceed. The only insight available is unofficial reports putting the actual level of support at closer to a third.

Moreover, as the government published most of the responses to both consultations, it is possible to see that a number of these responses were critical of both the Government's proposal and the consultation process; some even went on to complain that the UK government breached its own code of conduct for consultations by failing to mention a number of the new ideas arising from both consultations.

In the 2005 general election, all three parties included statements on reform of the House of Lords in their manifestos with the Conservatives and Liberal Democrats promising "substantially"/"predominantly" elected chambers. In December 2005, the Constitution Unit, part of the University College of London's School of Public Policy, released research findings showing "surprising levels of support from MPs and the public for the Lords to vote down government proposals":

Despite the unelected basis of the Lords these results make clear that it enjoys support from MPs and the general public to block policies that are perceived as unpopular. Far from clashing with the Commons it may even inflict government defeats with the silent approval of Labour MPs. Whilst government may wish to tame the powers of the Lords, these results suggest that voters are really quite happy with things as they are.

==== Constitutional Reform Act 2005 ====
On 24 March 2005, the Constitutional Reform Act 2005 received royal assent. It provides for replacement of the Lord Chancellor as the legislative speaker of the House of Lords with the Lord Speaker and the replacement of the Appellate Committee of the House of Lords with a Supreme Court.

The first Lord Speaker was elected in 2006.

The provisions relating to the Supreme Court came into force on 1 October 2009, when the new court started work. Most of the Law Lords became its first justices, but retained their peerages. A peerage is no longer required to sit in the UK's court of last resort, although life peerages are still customary; judges are nonetheless disqualified from sitting or voting in either house of Parliament as long as they remain judges.

==== 2006 discussions ====
In March 2006, House of Lords reform was again under discussion. This new interest resulted from the Cash-for-Honours scandal together with recent attempts by the Lords to block, water down, or add safeguards to (according to viewpoint) recent controversial legislation such as the Anti-terrorism, Crime and Security Act 2001, the Hunting Act 2004, the Terrorism Act 2006, the Identity Cards Act 2006, and the Racial and Religious Hatred Act 2006. Following the failure of the previous public consultations, to endorse the Government's proposals for reform, in April 2006, Baroness Amos announced the government had begun consulting with the other political parties and the Convenor of the Cross Benches on the membership of the House.

In the Cabinet reshuffle on 5 May 2006, governmental responsibility for this topic was transferred from Lord Falconer of Thoroton, both Secretary of State for Constitutional Affairs and Lord Chancellor, to the Leader of the House of Commons, Jack Straw.

Jack Straw now faced an enormous challenge. Although seen as modest reforms, the removal of most hereditary peers and rebalancing of the political make up of the House (Labour peers now formed the largest political party) were making the House increasingly confident of its own legitimacy. Paradoxically, far from making the Lords more submissive, more and more the House of Lords was willing to be assertive in its actions and confront the government.

On 22 January 2007 the Power Inquiry launched a campaign for greater citizen involvement and provided statistics showing that 68% of the public felt a jury of the general public should decide "the future of the House of Lords", 17% thought elected politicians should decide and 9% appointed civil servants.

==== 2007 white paper ====
On 8 February 2007, the Government published a new white paper following discussions of a cross-party working group convened by Jack Straw, Leader of the House of Commons. The consensus position adopted by the paper called for a House composed of elected members and members appointed by a new Statutory Appointments Commission. The new commission would select non-party-political appointees; party-political appointees would be nominated by party leaders in the House of Commons and vetted by the commission.

Any elected element would be elected under a regional list system. All elections and appointments would take place on a five-year cycle, with one third of the House admitted at each intake to a fixed fifteen-year term; this term would be non-renewable, to ensure members' independence. A further measure would prohibit former members of the reformed House from seeking election to the House of Commons before a minimum amount of time had elapsed after the expiry of their term in the reformed House – the Government suggested five years. The aim of this measure was to prevent aspiring politicians from using the reformed House as a base to launch a Parliamentary career. The Government proposed that elections and appointments should be held on the same day as elections for Britain's Members of the European Parliament – which also take place on a fixed five-year cycle.

Whilst the white paper made recommendations for a half-elected, half-appointed House, it proposed a free vote of MPs among seven options as to composition (see below). The white paper also recommended that at least 20% of members be non-party-political appointees: for example, under the white paper's proposal of a 50–50 split between elected and appointed members, the remaining 30% appointed members would be party political; under the 80%–20% elected/appointed option, there would be no party-political appointees. The 20% non-party-political element would include a reduced number of Church of England bishops, whose appointment would not go through the Statutory Appointments Commission. The total size of the House was proposed to be 540 members – with 180 introduced at each intake.

The paper provided for a gradual transition, with no life peers forced to retire before death, but with the possibility of a redundancy package should they choose to do so. The remaining hereditary peers would be removed, but the white paper left open whether they would be removed at one stroke or allowed a gradual removal by "natural wastage". The link between the peerage and membership of the House would be broken: peerages could still potentially be awarded as an honour, but would neither entail nor follow automatically from a seat in the House. The question of a possible new name for the reformed House was left open.

The white paper also proposed avoiding the risk of all options being rejected, as had occurred in the 2003 debate, by using the alternative vote system (also known as instant-runoff voting). Using the alternative vote for legislative proposals would have been a new precedent for the UK Parliament. Resistance by Members on all sides of the House of Commons caused Leader of the House of Commons Jack Straw to drop this proposal on 19 February. The free vote was therefore held under traditional Parliamentary procedures.

==== Votes of March 2007 ====
In March 2007 the Houses of Commons and Lords debated the proposals in the 2007 white paper and voted on a similar series of motions to those voted on in 2003. Unexpectedly, the House of Commons voted by a large majority for an all-elected Upper House. One week later, the House of Lords retorted by voting for an all-appointed House by a larger majority.

After the Commons vote, it was speculated by political commentators that some MPs supporting a fully appointed House had voted tactically for a fully elected House as the option likely to be least acceptable to the House of Lords. This called into question the significance of the larger majority achieved for 100% elected than that achieved for 80% elected. However, examination of the names of MPs voting at each division in the Commons shows that, of the 305 who voted for the 80% elected option, 211 went on to vote for the 100% elected option. Given that this vote took place after the vote on 80% – whose result was already known when the vote on 100% took place – this shows a clear preference in the Commons for a fully elected upper house over the only other option that passed, since any MP who favoured 80% over 100% would have voted against the latter motion, having already secured their preferred outcome (76 MPs – including Jack Straw, his shadow Theresa May and Opposition Leader David Cameron – did exactly that).

Parliamentary votes for an appointed House of Lords, 7/14 March 2007
Option		Lords		Commons	
Elected	Appointed	For	Against	For	Against
0%	100%	361	121	196	375
20%	80%	–	–	–	–
40%	60%	–	–	–	–
50%	50%	46	409	155	418
60%	40%	45	392	178	392
80%	20%	114	336	305	267
100%	0%	112	326	337	224
Retain bicameral		–	–	416	163
Remove hereditaries		–	–	391	111

There was strong opinion about the votes. Lord McNally, the Liberal Democrat leader in the Lords, said the Lords' decision

flies in the face of public opinion and of the commitment made by all three major parties at the last general election. ... A veto on constitutional reform by the House of Lords is not acceptable. It is now up to the House of Commons to assert its primacy. The Liberal Democrats' 100-year-old commitment to an elected House of Lords remains intact.

Prior to the debate Lord Lipsey, former economics editor of The Sunday Times, estimated the cost of the plans in the white paper at £1.092 billion over a 15-year term. The government dismissed this as "back-of-an-envelope calculations" and Jack Straw told the House of Commons that

May I say that Lord Lipsey's estimate is absolute utter balderdash and nonsense? It cannot be the case that a partly elected other place would cost £1 billion when the total cost of this place, according to the most extravagant analysis, is £300 million.

("Other place" is Commons jargon for the House of Lords.) In response Lord Lipsey accused Jack Straw of misleading the House of Commons:

He said that the figure was £300 million; in fact, for the latest year it is £468.8 million. For that, see the Written Answer from the noble Lord, Lord McKenzie of Luton, ... that is only the minor error. The major error is that he compared my costing for a full 15-year period with the annual cost of the House of Commons.

On 15 March, Lord Steel of Aikwood published a proposed bill approved by a large meeting of peers and MPs of all parties who had been working on these proposals for some time with proposals for four reforms:

1. End the by-elections for hereditary peers and turn the remaining ones into de facto life peers and finally end hereditary entry into our Upper House.
2. Create a Statutory Appointments Commission to replace Prime Ministerial patronage for new peers.
3. Authorise the government to proceed with a retirement package which should reduce the average age and decrease the present House of 740 by possibly 200.
4. Enable peerages to be removed from those guilty of serious offences on the same basis as the Commons.

=== Brown Labour government ===
On 19 July 2007, Jack Straw stated that the powers of the chamber, the method of election, financial packages and the number of members would yet again be discussed by a cross-party working group. The opposition's response was to suggest that "the real message in your statement today [is] that Lords reform is on ice until after the next election".

On 14 May 2008, Gordon Brown announced that the government intended to publish a new white paper on lords reform. This was issued by the Secretary of State for Justice Jack Straw in July 2008, containing proposals to create a wholly elected second chamber. The proposals did not move forward to become legislation. While a renewed white paper was pointed to in 2009, none was published before the general election in 2010. The Labour Party's manifesto at that election proposed a referendum on an elected House of Lords by October 2011.

==== Constitutional Reform and Governance Bill ====
During the legislative passage of the Constitutional Reform and Governance Bill, the government decided it to amend it to include the provisions relating to the abolition of further hereditary peers by-elections to the House of Lords. These provisions were removed in order to pass the legislation through parliamentary wash-up procedure.

=== Conservative–Liberal Democrat coalition government ===
The Conservative–Liberal Democrat coalition agreement agreed following the 2010 general election clearly outlined a provision for a wholly or mainly elected second chamber, elected by a proportional representation system. These proposals sparked a debate on 29 June 2010. As an interim measure, it was agreed that the appointment of new peers will reflect shares of the vote secured by the political parties in the last general election.

==== May 2011 proposals and draft bill ====
Detailed proposals for Lords reform including a draft House of Lords Reform Bill were published on 17 May 2011. These include a 300-member hybrid house, of which 80% are elected. A further 20% would be appointed, and reserve space would be included for some Church of England bishops. Under the proposals, members would also serve single non-renewable terms of 15 years. Former MPs would be allowed to stand for election to the upper house, but members of the upper house would not be immediately allowed to become MPs.

A number of the details of the proposal were incorporated into the House of Lords Reform Bill 2012 introduced to the Commons in June 2012.

The proposals were considered by a Joint Committee on House of Lords Reform made up of both MPs and Peers.

The Joint Committee on House of Lords Reform published its final report on 23 April 2012 and made the following suggestions:

- The reformed House of Lords should have 450 members.
- Peers with the least attendance should be the first to be removed from a mainly elected House.
- Up to 12 Lords Spiritual should be retained in a reformed House of Lords.

==== House of Lords Reform Bill 2012 ====
The bill, introduced by Nick Clegg, was given its first reading on 27 June 2012. On 9 July 2012, the bill began to be debated. The Government also tried to introduce a programme motion, which would have limited the amount of time available to debate the bill. Labour called for more scrutiny of the bill and said it would vote against the programme motion, along with several Conservative MPs. On 10 July 2012, it became clear that the Government was going to lose the vote on the programme motion and it was withdrawn. At the vote that evening on whether to give the bill a second reading, 91 Conservative MPs voted against the three line whip, while 19 more abstained. On 6 August 2012, Deputy Prime Minister Nick Clegg announced that the Government was abandoning the bill due to the opposition from Conservative backbench MPs, claiming that the Conservatives had "broken the coalition contract". However, David Cameron disputed this view, saying that the agreement contained no specific promise to enact reform of the House of Lords.

==== House of Lords Reform Act 2014 ====
The House of Lords Reform Act 2014 allowed members to resign from the House; previously there was no mechanism for this. It also allowed for the (non-retrospective) exclusion of any peer convicted of a criminal offence and sentenced to a term of imprisonment of one year or more.

==== Lords Spiritual (Women) Act 2015 ====
The Lords Spiritual (Women) Act 2015 regulates the procedure for women bishops to enter the House of Lords as Lords Spiritual. It stipulates that whenever a vacancy arises among the Lords Spiritual during the decade after the passing of the act, this vacancy is to be filled by a female bishop, if there are any eligible. This followed the Bishops and Priests (Consecration and Ordination of Women) Measure 2014, whereby the Church of England first ordained female bishops.

==== House of Lords (Expulsion and Suspension) Act 2015 ====
The House of Lords (Expulsion and Suspension) Act 2015 authorised the House to expel or suspend members.

=== May Conservative government ===
==== Burns report ====
In January 2017, Lord Fowler (the Lord Speaker), launched the inquiry of his new committee on the House's size. The committee, chaired by Lord Burns, reported on 31 October 2017, chiefly recommending a reduction to 600 members. To that end, the report recommended: members be appointed to 15 year terms; at least 20% would be independents/crossbenchers and no party would have a majority; party appointments would be tied to general election results; a "two-out, one-in" programme of departures to make reductions towards the target size.

=== Starmer Labour government ===
During and following the 2024 general election, the Labour Party detailed plans to extend the expiring Lords Spiritual (Women) Act 2015, eliminate hereditary peers from the House of Lords, and introduce mandatory retirement for Lords at 80 years of age.

On 30 July 2024, Baroness Smith of Basildon, the Leader of the House of Lords, introduced a bill to extend the Lords Spiritual (Women) Act 2015 by 5 years to 18 May 2030. On 5 September 2024, Keir Starmer's government introduced the House of Lords (Hereditary Peers) Bill in the House of Commons to remove all hereditary peers, including the Earl Marshal and Lord Great Chamberlain. This bill was passed, and came into effect in April 2026.

Across the aisle, Conservative Lord Norton of Louth introduced a private member's bill in September 2024 to reform the peerage appointment process by creating an advisory commission.

In October 2024, the Starmer government introduced a requirement that political parties would have to justify each of their nominations for peerages with "citations" similar to those for honours from monarch, consisting of statements of up to 150 words.

In December 2025, a new select committee of the House of Lords was formed, entitled the Retirement and Participation Committee, with a mandate to consider a potential retirement age and a potential participation requirement. Baroness Taylor of Bolton was appointed chair. The other members were: Baroness Anelay of St Johns, Lord Blunkett, Viscount Chandos, Baroness Hayman, Baroness Manningham-Buller, Baroness Mattinson, Baroness Parminter, Lord Sherbourne of Didsbury, Lord Smith of Hindhead, Lord Strathclyde and Baroness Suttie. The committee published its report in July 2026. The committee recommended the introduction of an initial retirement age of 85 years old, with this being annually decreased by a year, until reaching the permanent retirement age of 80. The committee recommended a participation requirement of 20% of all sitting days, with appropriate mitigations for individual circumstances.

In February 2026, a new all-party parliamentary group on "wholesale" reform of the House of Lords was formed.

== Opinion polling ==
Various questions have been asked about House of Lords reform by opinion polling companies. The following table includes a selection of polls of the general public summarised by whether respondents support the abolition of the House of Lords, a partially or fully elected second chamber or the House of Lords remaining as an appointed chamber.

Dates conducted	Polling organisation	Client	Sample size	Support abolition (%)	Support partial or fully elected chamber (%)	Support status quo (%)	Support appointed members with term limit of 10 years (%)	Undecided (%)	Question
13 January 2020	YouGov	N/A	1,908	22%	28%	15%	—	31%	Thinking about the future of the House of Lords, which of the following would you most like to see?
23–24 May 2018	YouGov	N/A	1,654	21%	34%	16%	—	25%	Thinking about the future of the House of Lords, which of the following would you most like to see? 4% stated 'something else'.
6–17 May 2018	ComRes	We, The People	2,045	24%	37%	17%	22%	—	Which of these do you personally think should happen to the House of Lords? Please indicate which one option best represents your view.
17–20 October 2017	BMG	Electoral Reform Society (ERS)	1,148	27%	63%	10%	—	—	Currently, members of the House of Lords are not elected but appointed to the chamber by the Queen on the advice of the Prime Minister. Which of the following statements is closest to your view?

A number of other opinion polls on House of Lords reform have been reported between 2007 and 2012.

== Reasons for reform ==
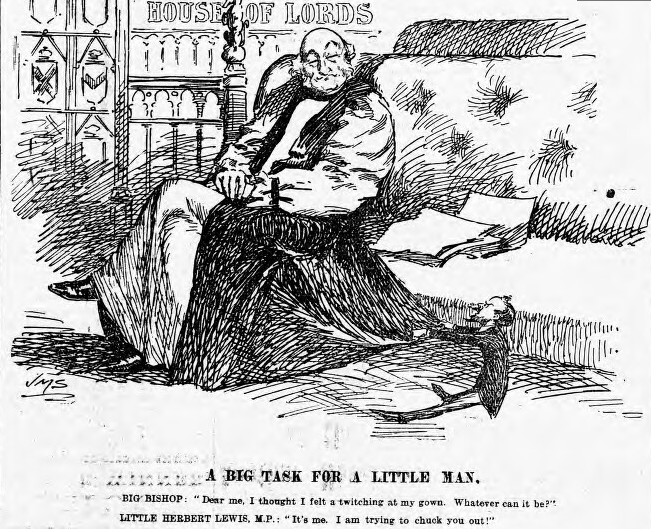
An 1899 cartoon characterising Herbert Lewis's unsuccessful attempts to remove religious peers from the House of Lords

There are several criticisms of the House of Lords, including:

- The appointments process, which has often been described as unprincipled and questionable. Both the Labour Party and the Conservative Party regularly appoint people in exchange for money.
- Peers all enjoy lifetime job security. They are allowed to hold their seats until death.
- The makeup of the Lords does not reflect the social and demographic diversity of the UK, with under-representation of ethnic minorities and women.
- The United Kingdom is one of the only countries in the world to award religious figures a permanent seat in the legislature.
- Unlike the French Senate, which equally represents all French regions, the House of Lords has an over-representation of people from southern England. The North West and East and West Midlands are underrepresented regions.
- The House of Lords is often criticised for being too large. With almost 800 members, it is the second-largest legislative house in the world, only after the National People's Congress of China. The physical capacity of the chamber only has about 400 seats, which has led to "jostling for space".

These criticisms have led some to question whether there is a need for a second house at all, and whether the bicameral system in British politics is still useful. Some nations such as Norway, Sweden, Portugal, New Zealand and Denmark are unicameral.

== The range of options ==
"Central to the future House of Lords is its composition. For the Lords to act with legitimacy as an effective and balanced second chamber, it must have the right form to deliver the range of roles and functions it needs". With 1101 submissions to the first consultation, several hundred to the second and multiple articles in the newspapers and various discussions, there were a number of different views on reform of the House of Lords. It is only possible to give a broad outline of the different proposals and even then only those where the proposals were mentioned by a number of respondents.

Proposals are listed alphabetically

=== Abolition ===
Multiple legislatures, such as the parliaments of Norway, Sweden, Portugal, Denmark, Israel and New Zealand (and within the UK, the Scottish Parliament, the Senedd and the Northern Ireland Assembly) are unicameral and thus do not have an upper house. Instead, scrutiny is carried out by parliamentary committees. A minority of MPs voted for the outright abolition of the upper house in 2003, and it was Labour party policy until the late 1980s. One of the most well known MPs to advocate the abolition of the House of Lords was Tony Benn. In January 2020, during the 2020 Labour Party leadership election, candidate Rebecca Long-Bailey announced her support for abolishing the House of Lords. The Scottish National Party (SNP) favours abolition, and as such has no members of the House of Lords.

In November 2022, Keir Starmer stated that if elected, the Labour Party would abolish the House of Lords and replace it with an "Assembly of the Nations and Regions" consisting of 200 elected members. In February 2024, Labour was reported in the Financial Times to have moved to delay plans to abolish the House of Lords until after its first term, instead implementing "only limited reforms to the Lords in order to focus on economic priorities", such as that announced in April 2024 that would "swiftly abolish all hereditary peers" within a first term.

The leader of the Green Party of England and Wales, Zack Polanski supports abolishing the House of Lords.

=== Allotment (sortition) ===
There was a considerable number of proposals in the consultation for an Upper House chosen by allotment (random selection). Proposals varied from a House chosen completely at random from the whole electorate to those where allotment was applied to smaller groups such as those volunteering or those selected in another way. Most proposals referred to the allotment of the governing juries in the democracy of Ancient Greece, where selection by lot was considered to be more democratic than election:

I mean, for example, that it is thought to be democratic for the offices to be assigned by lot, for them to be elected is oligarchic.

— Aristotle, Politics

Research has suggested that parliaments including randomly selected members are likely to be more efficient and to result in greater benefits to society.

However, at present within the UK this form of selection is mainly restricted to the allotment of jurors. Opposition is based either on the practical need for some expertise amongst members of the upper chamber or on a belief that "democracy means an elected second chamber".

=== Appointment ===
The reason that the UK almost uniquely (except for Canada) still retained an appointed second chamber in 1997 was that it was widely accepted that it worked effectively. In particular the large number of cross bench peers would be impossible to achieve in most electoral systems.

The great strength of the Lords is that it contains not just a bunch of experienced retired MPs but a whole raft of individuals with specialist knowledge and experience from the worlds of commerce, medicine, the services, the civil service, academia, the unions – the list is endless – none of whom would be likely to be available to stand for election. (Lord Steel of Aikwood, former Alliance leader, in 2007)

Those supporting a fully appointed House reject the idea of a composite partly elected, party appointed House:

I can think of nothing more destructive of the present harmonious atmosphere in the Lords. Elected members would be justifiably incensed if the votes of appointed members happened to determine any issue before the house.

The main issues are:

- achieving a range of representation, bringing in those with skills and experience, allowing ex officio members and ensuring a continuity of membership;
- maintaining the status and independence of the Lords without endangering the supremacy of the Commons;
- maintaining the low cost of the present House; and
- preventing the possibility of a constitutional clash between appointed and elected members.

=== Combination (mixed members) ===
By far the most commonly suggested proposal for reform amongst politicians is a combination of an elected and appointed House and this was the original proposal recommended by the Wakeham Report. Proponents suggest the combination would allow an appointed element to retain the skills and experience of the present House and elections would make it democratic without the problems of being fully elected which would allow the Upper House to challenge the primacy of the Commons. Opponents say that the two types of members will inevitably conflict, voting for part of the House will have little support amongst an already sceptical electorate, and the lack of synergy will make it worse than either a fully elected or fully appointed house. Various proposals on the exact percentage of those elected and appointed have been produced:

- In April 1999, a commission established by the Conservatives recommended a House of Lords with a mixed composition:
  - 150 members appointed by a commission on the basis of specific skills or experience.
  - 99 would be chosen by the devolved institutions or English regions.
  - 99 directly elected (33 at each general election, to serve for three Parliaments).
  - 100 life appointments
  - One seat for the Lord Chancellor
  - One seat for the leader of the House of Lords
- In January 2002, the Conservatives unveiled plans for a 300-member "Senate", with 240 members elected by first past the post for 15 years.
- The Elect the Lords campaign set up by New Politics Network and Charter88 supports a predominantly elected second chamber.
- In 2005, a cross party group of MPs chaired by Paul Tyler consisting of Kenneth Clarke, Robin Cook, Dr Tony Wright and Sir George Young proposed a 70% elected second chamber, elected in thirds at each general election using the single transferable vote. This proposal was largely adopted by the Power Commission.

=== Appointment by jury ===
Under this proposal, a jury would appoint some or all members of the chamber so retaining the skills and experience of the present House and also making its selection more democratic; the jury being considered to give democratic legitimacy to the appointments without the problems of mandating the House through elections which might lead to a potential conflict with the Commons. It was a minority "grass roots option" not seen before the second consultation where it was supported by around 10% of submissions.

=== Election ===
Multiple countries have directly elected Upper Chambers but they try to make their electoral systems for the second chamber as distinct as possible from the first chamber by holding elections on a different cycle or electing only a proportion of members on each occasion. Politicians such as Tony Benn maintained that elections are necessary to be democratic, stating, "Democracy means an elected second chamber", however Tony Benn later advocated for the abolition of the House of Lords.

According to the Government report, the advantages of an elected Upper House are:

- Legitimacy: A directly elected body would have a democratic mandate.
- Status of members: Membership of the second chamber would be seen as a job with specific and important duties attached.
- Representation: All parts of the country and all shades of political opinion could be represented.
- Age: An elected House is likely to have more younger people in it than a nominated one and therefore be more reflective of society.
- Entrenched bicameralism: It is an unequivocal sign the Government was committed to a bicameral legislature.

The main disadvantages are:

- Conflict with the House of Commons: It may challenge the supremacy of the Commons on the strength of its own electoral mandate – a conflict that may be difficult to resolve given the largely unwritten constitution of the UK.
- Loss of independents and ex officio membership: It would be virtually impossible to retain any independent, non-party element in the House.
- Age: An elected House would have more younger people than a nominated one which would have less experience.
- Composed of simply politicians: Politicians who would be whipped by the Government of the day, removing independence.
- Transitional difficulties: The transition to a fully elected House would be most disruptive.
- Higher costs: Elections, proper salaries and research facilities would considerably increase the costs.
- Loss of diversity: the current membership of the House of Lords has a higher proportion of women, disabled and black and minority ethnic people when compared the House of Commons and other elected bodies in the UK. A move to an elected chamber would be likely to diminish this diversity.

Multiple submissions from the public rejected the notion that an elected Upper House would be democratic, basing their assertion on the model of the Athenian democracy which did not elect either the Upper House or assembly. (The Athenian Upper House was a court allotted from all citizens, and any citizen was able to attend the assembly.)

The main variation between proposals for an elected Upper House is the form of election:

- Most proponents support a system of Proportional Representation
- The Conservatives have called for the second chamber to be elected by First Past the Post.

=== Hereditary ===
It has been suggested by some that the hereditary peerage ought to be restored to the House of Lords. The Parliament Acts 1911 and 1949 are particularly cited by proponents of this idea in that the House of Lords no longer has power of veto, merely a power of delay, making the assertion of democratic accountability being required for legislators redundant, in their eyes, as the Lords has no power to force its will upon the House of Commons.

A number of hereditary members of the Lords were suggested to have voted on legislation through matters of conviction as their chances of achieving high office was unlikely therefore they were not compelled to vote on party lines under the threat of being deprived of ministerial promotion. The high portion of hereditary peers that sat as crossbenchers relative to the amount of independents in the House of Commons is also cited as verification of this fact and that hereditary peers generally take a more long-term perspective on legislative matters, unlike Members of Parliament who are statistically more likely to vote in favour of populist policies for electoral purposes.

However, a hereditary right passing down the generations was argued as promoting a divided society between the upper classes and the lower classes. Moreover, in practice, the hereditary peers had a natural bias on certain issues, such as a socially conservative outlook and unwillingness to support liberal and socialist legislation. (In the events which led to the original legislation to reduce their power, the House of Lords were opposed to the People's Budget, which did not serve their interests, as it was built to help the middle and lower classes, while taxing land owners and the "idle rich", promising wealth redistribution.)

=== Indirect election/appointment ===
About 30% of overseas second chambers are elected by indirect methods, including the upper houses of France, the Republic of Ireland, the Netherlands, South Africa and the pre-1913 United States. The electoral college often consists of members of local authorities or regional assemblies, and may include members of the primary chamber. There are various proposals:

- Elections by Regional Development Agencies and voluntary regional chambers, the London Assembly "would demonstrate a direct connection between these other bodies and the central institutions at Westminster" and because "many of these bodies had themselves been elected ... it could therefore reinforce the democratic nature of an otherwise nominated House".

=== Lord Steel of Aikwood's reform proposals ===
In 2012, Liberal Democrat peer Lord Steel of Aikwood proposed a solution to avoid four identified pitfalls of reform, namely:

- Conflict between two elected houses
- Territorial peers threatening the role of constituency MPs
- The huge expense of (i) further national elections and of (ii) full-time salaried peers
- The loss of experience and expertise among independent peers.

Lord Steel of Aikwood's proposal would have an upper house, "The Senate", comprising 450 members, to be known as "senators". Immediately after the 5-yearly general elections, 150 senators would be elected for 15 years. Voting would not be by universal suffrage: this electorate would be the newly elected MPs, MEPs, and Members of the three devolved legislatures: the National Assembly for Wales, Scottish Parliament and Northern Ireland Assembly.

Lord Steel of Aikwood suggested this would be "simple, inexpensive and likely to produce a less London-centric chamber than at present", adding "such a fundamental, democratically reformed upper chamber would maintain the existing revising role, be part-time and unpaid, though needing tougher declaration of interest rules than at present". The Senate would retain existing powers and conventions. It follows that, after each general election, the new cohort of 150 senators would have a similar party make-up to the Commons, whilst the other 300 senators would continue in post, unaffected by contemporary electoral swings.

Steel suggested the "Senate" nomenclature "so that so-called Lords are spared the embarrassment of the title". Whether his ideas might lead to changing the name of the House of Commons remains to be seen, as presumably any adoption of Steel's Senate proposals might consequently permit the aristocracy to stand for parliament. Also, transitional arrangements would have to be made to decide which existing members of the House of Lords would stay on, for five or ten years respectively, as the "sitting 300".

Steel's outline proposals did not specifically mention the Lords Spiritual, but, just like hereditary peers, presumably bishops would no longer have any reserved seats in the Senate.

=== Secondary mandate ===
A system proposed by musician and activist Billy Bragg (and endorsed by The Economist) whereby the share of each party's votes at each general election is aggregated and each party is allocated a number of places proportionately using a closed list system. Each elector would have one vote which would both determine their local MP and the composition of the Upper House.

The advantages of this system are claimed to be that: there would be only one election campaign to fund, it does not waste votes because votes for minority parties will count in the Upper House and so it should improve voter turnout, and as the upper house has no direct vote it has no separate mandate and so the Commons will remain supreme. Critics however see a single vote as a choice between voting for an MP or voting for the upper house; if large numbers choose to vote for the upper house instead of their MP it would undermine the mandate of the Commons and create a confused election (for example MPs might be ousted by a poor performance of their party in the Upper House and vice versa).

== Other issues ==
- At present, the Scottish Parliament and Senedd have devolved powers over areas like Health and Education. The Scottish Parliament and Senedd do not have upper chambers but instead MSPs and MSs scrutinise legislation in committee systems. This means that, for example, legislation on English health and education is subject to the House of Lords, whilst Scottish and possibly Welsh legislation are not.
- There are some concerns that a reformed upper house may be "a feeder body" into the lower house (Charlotte Atkins MP) as has occurred in other countries with bicameral parliaments. Various proposals have been put forward to prevent this happening, including a five-year ban on former members of the Lords seeking election to the Commons. Others are concerned that the upper house may be filled by MPs who lose their seats. Proposals to deal with this problem include lifetime disqualification for membership of the House of Commons as a condition of a place in a reformed upper house.
- The future of peerages. One proposal is that peerages should remain, as part of the honours system, but that they should no longer be linked to membership of the upper house.
- The name. Were the link between peerages and membership of the upper house to end, the name of the upper house might also change as a consequence. The Liberal Democrats, and more recently the Conservatives, have proposed that the upper house converts to the senatorial system, as is constituted in several other English-speaking countries. Labour, in the report from its Commission on the UK's Future, has suggested the name "Assembly of the Nations and Regions".

== See also ==
- Constitutional Reform Act 2005
- Constitutional reform in the United Kingdom
- Democratisation
- Disestablishmentarianism
- Election
- Gunpowder Plot
- List of acts of the Parliament of the United Kingdom enacted without the House of Lords' consent
- Canadian Senate reform
