= Parliamentary Voting System and Constituencies Act 2011 =

Act of Parliament of the United Kingdom

Parliamentary Voting System and Constituencies Act 2011 (Note: Section 20.)
- Act of Parliament
- Parliament of the United Kingdom
- Long title: An Act to make provision for a referendum on the voting system for parliamentary elections and to provide for parliamentary elections to be held under the alternative vote system if a majority of those voting in the referendum are in favour of that; to make provision about the number and size of parliamentary constituencies; and for connected purposes.
- Citation: 2011 c. 1
- Introduced by: Nick Clegg, Deputy Prime Minister of the United Kingdom (Commons); Lord McNally, Deputy Leader of the House of Lords (Lords)
- Territorial extent: United Kingdom (Note: Section 18.)

Dates
- Royal assent: 16 February 2011
- Commencement: 16 February 2011: The whole act except section 9, schedule 10 and part 1 of schedule 12 (Note: Section 19.)
Other legislation
Amends	House of Commons Disqualification Act 1975; Representation of the People Act 1983; Representation of the People Act 1985; Parliamentary Constituencies Act 1986; Boundary Commissions Act 1992; Local Government (Wales) Act 1994; Local Government etc. (Scotland) Act 1994; Scotland Act 1998; Greater London Authority Act 1999; Political Parties, Elections and Referendums Act 2000; Government of Wales Act 2006
Amended by	Parliamentary Constituencies Act 2020; Senedd Cymru (Members and Elections) Act 2024
Relates to	Representation of the People Act 1983; Parliamentary Constituencies Act 1986; Political Parties, Elections and Referendums Act 2000

Status: Amended

History of passage through Parliament

Text of statute as originally enacted

Revised text of statute as amended

The Parliamentary Voting System and Constituencies Act 2011 (c. 1) is an act of the Parliament of the United Kingdom that made provision for the holding of a referendum on whether to introduce the Alternative Vote system in all future general elections to the UK Parliament and also made provision on the number and size of parliamentary constituencies. The bill for the act was introduced to the House of Commons on 22 July 2010 and passed third reading on 2 November by 321 votes to 264. The House of Lords passed the Bill, with amendments, on 14 February 2011, and after some compromises between the two Houses on amendments, it received Royal Assent on 16 February 2011.

== Provisions ==
The act brought together two different constitutional aims of the Conservative-Liberal Democrat Coalition:

- The Liberal Democrats had long promoted an alternative to first-past-the-post elections and so the act legislated for the holding of a national referendum on whether to introduce the Alternative Vote system for the UK Parliament in all future general elections.
- Prior to the election, the manifestos of both coalition parties stated that they wished to reduce the number of Members of Parliament from 650: the Conservatives' target figure was 585; the Liberal Democrats' target was 500; the act set the future number of constituencies as 600. The Act also aimed to fulfil a Conservative aim to reduce the over-representation of Scotland and Wales, relative to the remaining English constituencies. The Electoral Registration and Administration Act 2013 later delayed implementation of the changes to the number of constituencies until at least 2018, resulting in the 2015, 2017 and 2019 general elections being held without the boundary changes.

== Part 1 – Voting Systems for Parliamentary Elections ==
Part 1 of the act comprises sections 1 to 9. Section 1 sets out the question to be put to voters, in English and Welsh. Section 4 sets out provisions associated with the date of the Referendum, whereby the date for the poll and one or more 2011 United Kingdom local elections, 2011 Scottish Parliament election, 2011 National Assembly for Wales election or 2011 Northern Ireland Assembly election will be taken on the same day. Section 9 set out amendments to the Representation of the People Act 1983 if the vote was "Yes". These included that the voter puts numbers 1, 2, etc against as many candidates' names as desired; how the count is conducted (instant run-off); and how the returning officer records the count.

=== The referendum ===
The act legislated for a referendum to be held in the United Kingdom on whether to introduce the alternative vote electoral method of electing Members of Parliament (MPs) to the House of Commons in all future UK general elections on Thursday 5 May 2011. The referendum would be conducted by the Electoral Commission and overseen by an appointed chief counting officer (CCO) and a deputy chief counting officer (DCCO) who would declare the final result for the United Kingdom. The Electoral Commission is the public body under the terms of the Political Parties, Elections and Referendums Act 2000 that was given the task to raise public awareness ahead of polling day, and to oversee the conduct of the referendum.

=== Referendum question ===
The question that appeared on ballot papers in the referendum before the electorate under the act was (in English):

At present, the UK uses the "first past the post" system to elect MPs to the House of Commons. Should the "alternative vote" system be used instead?

In Wales, the question on the ballot paper also appeared in Welsh:

Ar hyn o bryd, mae'r DU yn defnyddio'r system "y cyntaf i'r felin" i ethol ASau i Dŷ'r Cyffredin. A ddylid defnyddio'r system "pleidlais amgen" yn lle hynny?

permitting a simple YES / NO answer (to be marked with a single (X)).

==== Original proposed question ====
The original proposed question in English was:

Do you want the United Kingdom to adopt the "alternative vote" system instead of the current "first past the post" system for electing Members of Parliament to the House of Commons?

In Welsh:

Ydych chi am i'r Deyrnas Unedig fabwysiadu'r system "bleidlais amgen" yn lle'r system "first past the post" presennol ar gyfer ethol Aelodau Seneddol i Dŷ'r Cyffredin?

permitting a simple YES / NO answer (to be marked with a single (X)).

This wording was criticised by the Electoral Commission, saying that "particularly those with lower levels of education or literacy, found the question hard work and did not understand it". The Electoral Commission recommended a changed wording to make the issue easier to understand, and the government subsequently amended the Bill to bring it into line with the Electoral Commission's recommendations.

=== Voting areas ===
Under the provisions of the act, the designation of a "voting area" (also known by some as "Counting areas") on the day of the referendum was to be overseen by "Counting officers" (CO) who were to declare the results of their local areas within the United Kingdom and Gibraltar is as follows:

- A district in England for which there is a district council
- A county in England in which there are no districts with councils (Unitary authority)
- A London borough
- The City of London (including the Inner and Middle Temples)
- The Isles of Scilly
- A constituency of the Scottish Parliament in Scotland
- A constituency of the National Assembly for Wales
- Northern Ireland

There were a total of 440 voting areas. 326 in England, 73 in Scotland, 40 in Wales and a single area for Northern Ireland.

=== Regional counts ===
The act also provides provision for the results from the "voting areas" to fed into twelve "regional counts" to be overseen by "Regional counting officers" (RCO) which were appointed in the following areas and declared the results for their areas as used under the European Parliamentary Elections Act 2002 but with the exception of Gibraltar which did not participate in the referendum:

- East Midlands (40 voting areas)
- East of England (47 voting areas)
- Greater London (33 voting areas)
- Northern Ireland (1 voting area)
- North East England (12 voting areas)
- North West England (39 voting areas)
- Scotland (73 voting areas)
- South East England (67 voting areas)
- South West England (37 voting areas)
- Yorkshire and the Humber (21 voting areas)
- Wales (40 voting areas)
- West Midlands (30 voting areas)

The regions each declared their results once all local voting areas had declared their local results late on Friday 7 May 2011. There was no provision under the act for any national or regional recounts by the Chief Counting Officer and Regional Counting Officers.

=== Franchise ===
The right to vote in the referendum applied to UK residents who are British, Irish and Commonwealth citizens, in accordance with the provisions of the Representation of the People Act 1983 and the Representation of the People Act 2000. Members of the House of Lords were able to vote in the referendum. Citizens of other EU countries resident in the UK were not allowed to vote unless they were citizens of the Republic of Ireland, Malta or Cyprus. The same Acts permitted UK nationals who had lived overseas for less than 15 years to vote. Voting on the day of the referendum was from 0700 to 2200 BST (Western European Summer Time). Also under the provisions of the Representation of the People Act 2000 postal ballots were also permitted in the referendum and were sent out to eligible voters some three weeks ahead of the vote. The minimum age for voters in the referendum was 18 years, in accordance with Representation Acts (above). A House of Lords amendment proposing to only make the result of the referendum valid if the national turnout was higher than 40% was defeated in the House of Commons.

=== Referendum result ===
Of the 440 voting areas in the United Kingdom a total of 430 returned majority votes for "No" whilst just ten returned majority votes for "Yes" with all twelve regional count areas returning "No" majorities. Yes No

The result was declared by Chief counting officer (CCO) and the then chair of the Electoral Commission Jenny Watson on Saturday 7 May 2011 after all 440 voting areas and the 12 regions of the United Kingdom had declared their results on a national turnout of 42%. The decision by the electorate in all four countries was a decisive "No" to adopting the alternative vote system in all future United Kingdom general elections.

2011 United Kingdom Alternative Vote referendum
Choice	Votes	%
Yes	6,152,607	32.10
No	13,013,123	67.90
Total	19,165,730	100.00
Valid votes	19,165,730	99.41
Invalid/blank votes	113,292	0.59
Total votes	19,279,022	100.00
Registered voters/turnout	45,684,501	42.20
Source: Electoral Commission

National referendum results (without spoiled ballots):
Yes: 6,152,607 (32.10%)	No: 13,013,123 (67.90%)
▲

Results by counting regions

Region	Electorate	Voter turnout, of eligible	Votes		Proportion of votes	
Region	Electorate	Voter turnout, of eligible	Yes	No	Yes	No
East Midlands	3,348,469	42.8%	408,877	1,013,864	28.74%	71.26%
East of England	4,263,006	43.1%	530,140	1,298,004	29.00%	71.00%
Greater London	5,258,802	35.4%	734,427	1,123,480	39.53%	60.47%
North East England	1,968,137	38.8%	212,951	546,138	28.05%	71.95%
North West England	5,239,323	39.1%	613,249	1,416,201	30.22%	69.78%
Northern Ireland	1,198,966	55.8%	289,088	372,706	43.68%	56.32%
Scotland	3,893,268	50.7%	713,813	1,249,375	36.36%	63.64%
South East England	6,288,366	43.1%	823,793	1,951,793	29.68%	70.32%
South West England	4,028,829	44.6%	564,541	1,225,305	31.54%	68.46%
Wales	2,268,739	41.7%	325,349	616,307	34.55%	65.45%
West Midlands	4,093,521	39.8%	461,847	1,157,772	28.52%	71.48%
Yorkshire and the Humber	3,835,075	39.9%	474,532	1,042,178	28.52%	68.71%

Results by constituent countries

Country	Electorate	Voter turnout, of eligible	Votes		Proportion of votes	
Country	Electorate	Voter turnout, of eligible	Yes	No	Yes	No
England	38,323,528	40.7%	4,786,532	10,724,067	30.86%	69.14%
Northern Ireland	1,198,966	55.8%	289,088	372,306	43.68%	56.32%
Scotland	3,893,269	50.7%	713,813	1,249,375	36.36%	63.64%
Wales	2,268,739	41.7%	325,349	616,307	34.55%	65.45%

=== AV Repeal ===
The alternative vote system provisions within the act were repealed following the decisive "No" vote in the referendum on 8 July 2011 via a Statutory Instrument.

== Part 2 – Parliamentary Constituencies ==
Part 2, comprising sections 10 to 13, amends the Parliamentary Constituencies Act 1986 including replacing Schedule 2 to introduce changes to the boundaries and number of UK constituencies, and the processes for their review. The changes for constituencies include:

- Reducing the number of constituencies in the House of Commons from 650 to 600.
- Specifying that each constituency will be wholly within one of England, Wales, Scotland or Northern Ireland. (All existing constituencies already fulfil this requirement.)
- Requiring the electorate of constituencies to be within 5 percent of a "United Kingdom electoral quota" (which is the national average of the number of voters per constituency, calculated after four "protected constituencies" have been removed from the equation). This electorate requirement overrides considerations of local geographical and political boundaries with the following exceptions:
  - The two island constituencies of Orkney and Shetland and Na h-Eileanan an Iar (Western Isles) are explicitly preserved.
  - Two constituencies for the Isle of Wight. (This was an increase from the single constituency that existed up until this point.)
  - Constituencies covering more than 12,000 km^{2} (4,600 sq mi) may be lower in electorate than 5 percent below the national average. (Of the current constituencies, this would apply only to the Highland constituency of Ross, Skye and Lochaber.)
  - Where the difference between the electorate of Northern Ireland and the United Kingdom electoral quota multiplied by the number of seats allocated to Northern Ireland exceeds one third of the United Kingdom electoral quota, then the electorate of Northern Irish constituencies shall be:
    - No less than whichever is the lesser of the difference between the average electorate per seat in Northern Ireland and 5% of the United Kingdom electoral quota and 95% of the United Kingdom electoral quota.
    - No more than whichever is the greater of the difference between the average electorate per seat in Northern Ireland and 5% of the United Kingdom electoral quota and 105% of the United Kingdom electoral quota.
- No constituency may be larger than 13,000 km^{2} (5,000 sq mi).
- A specific allocation method between the four nations of the United Kingdom.
- The four boundary commissions of the United Kingdom are to conduct constituency reviews before 1 October 2013 and before 1 October of every subsequent fifth year.
- The Boundary Commission for England may consider the boundaries of the regions used for elections to the European Parliament in its processes.
- The link between Westminster and Welsh Assembly constituencies is removed. The government is intending to propose future arrangements for Welsh Assembly constituencies in time for the 2015 Assembly elections.
- "Public Hearings" to hear views about the boundary commissions' proposals, in place of the previous "Local Inquiries".
- The consultation period for the public to submit their views in writing is extended to twelve weeks from four weeks.

=== Passage of Part 2 through Parliament ===
The bill instructed the boundary commissions to undertake the Sixth Periodic Review of Westminster constituencies before 2014, which would have involved a significant redistribution of seats between the four parts of the UK and the near-equalisation of constituency sizes by registered electorate. In accordance with this, the Boundary Commissions began a full revision of constituency boundaries with an instruction to reduce the number of constituencies to 600 and to recommend constituencies which are no more than 5% above or below the standard size. However, in August 2012, Liberal Democrats party leader Nick Clegg announced that his party would oppose the implementation of the new constituency boundaries as a reaction to the failure of the government to enact House of Lords reform. In January 2013, the government lost a vote on this timetable, which effectively ended the entire process. The boundary commissions were required to produce their reports by 1 October 2013 but they announced the cancellation of the reviews on 31 January 2013.

== Part 3 ==
=== Short title, commencement and extent ===
Section 18 of the act provided that the act would extend to the United Kingdom, save that part 1 of schedule 3 would extend only to England and Wales and Scotland, and that part 2 of that schedule would extend only to Northern Ireland.

Section 20 of the act provided that the act may be cited as the "Parliamentary Voting System and Constituencies Act 2011".

== Schedules ==
- Schedule 1 deals with the referendum. This section includes information and instruction relating to the role and responsibilities of Returning Officers, Counting Officers, the Electoral Commission, and the declaration of the referendum result.
- Schedule 2 outlines the administrative and logistical rules behind the referendum, including ballot paper design, polling station provision, the nature of the counting of the votes and the ballot box design.
- Schedule 3 amends the rules on proxy and absent voting.
- Schedule 4 amends or appeals existing Representation of the People Acts and Electoral Administration laws with relation to all aspects of the referendum campaign and polling day.
- Schedules 5 to 8 set out how the referendum and local/devolved assembly elections will be combined.
- Schedule 9 builds regulations relating to funding, loans and permitted financial transactions during the referendum campaign.
- Schedule 10 amends regulations relating to the conduct of polling day in the event of the United Kingdom adopting the alternative vote.
- Schedule 11 outlines consequential amendments and repeals.

The Act does not alter the structure and independence of the various boundary commissions that are responsible for carrying out reviews of constituencies.

== Commencement ==
As per section 19, the majority of the provisions of the act came into force upon Royal Assent. However, under section 8, the alternative vote provisions could have come into force only if more votes were cast in the referendum in favour of the answer "Yes" than in favour of the answer "No"; and the Order in Council giving effect to the new boundaries had been made. In any case, the referendum was resoundingly defeated, and so the alternative vote provisions were repealed on 8 July 2011.

== Timeline ==
The initial timeline for consideration of the Bill was set out at the beginning of the process.

- 6 September 2010. Commons: Second Reading
- 12–25 October 2010. Commons: Committee Stage (line-by-line discussion, amendment and alteration of the bill by a Committee of the whole House)
- 1–2 November 2010. Commons: Report Stage
- 2 November 2010. Commons: Third Reading
- 15–16 November 2010. Lords: Second Reading
- 30 November 2010. Lords: Committee Stage
- February 2011. Conclusion of Lords stages and Royal Assent

The Bill passed through the House of Commons on schedule. The committee stage in the House of Lords began on 30 November 2010, and on the second day of Committee stage debate the government were defeated when an amendment moved by Lord Rooker allowing the date of the AV referendum to be varied from 4 May 2011 was carried by 199 to 195.

Labour Parliamentarians opposed the sections of the Bill relating to constituencies, asserting that it amounted to a 'gerrymander', and urged the government to divide the Bill into two so that the section relating to the referendum on voting systems could be passed swiftly. The prime minister dismissed requests that the two elements of the Bill should be split.

By the middle of January, with the Bill having had eight days of consideration in Committee in the House of Lords, the government voiced concern about the length of time being taken for a Bill which needed to be enacted by 16 February in order to allow the planned referendum to take place in May. Three of the Lords' four sitting days in the following week were set aside for the Bill and the prime minister's spokesman commented that some could be long days, with the House possibly sitting all night. The Leader of the House of Lords, Lord Strathclyde, complained that "the Labour peers are on a go-slow" and filibustering the Bill. He was reported to be considering introducing a guillotine motion to the debate, which would have been an unprecedented move for the House of Lords.

On 17 January, consideration of the Bill in Committee began at 3:10 PM. After a dinner break for an hour in the evening, at 11:38 PM the House had completed debate on only one amendment. Lord Trefgarne moved a rare closure motion "that the question be now put" which was carried, bringing an end to debate on a second amendment. After fending off Labour attempts to adjourn the House at 12:14 AM, 3:31 AM, and 9:01 AM, the sitting continued until 12:52 PM on 18 January. In order to keep Peers present during the all night sitting, the Coalition provided refreshment and arranged for celebrity Peers such as Julian Fellowes and Sebastian Coe to give talks. Parliamentary officials turned two committee rooms into makeshift dormitories for male and female Peers. During the whole sitting, only eight amendments were debated.

The convenor of the Crossbench Peers, Baroness D'Souza, made it clear that she would strongly oppose any attempt to guillotine debate, and at the end of January Strathclyde announced that (after discussion with Labour through the 'usual channels') the Government would bring forward a "package of concessions" in order to break the deadlock. The Committee stage concluded on 2 February after 17 days of debate.

Report stage of the Bill in the House of Lords took place on 7, 8 and 9 February 2011, and the Bill was given a Third Reading and passed back to the Commons with amendments on 14 February.

== Reaction and analysis ==
Upon launching the bill, Deputy Prime Minister Nick Clegg said that "by making constituencies more equal in size, the value of your vote will no longer depend on where you live, and with fewer MPs the cost of politics will be cut." While Labour promised a referendum for AV in their election manifesto, they announced that they would nevertheless oppose the Bill, saying that the constituency boundary changes would help the Conservatives.

There was strong cross-party opposition to the bill in Cornwall as the boundary of Cornwall will not be respected when constituency boundaries are drawn up. Commenting on this, Prime Minister David Cameron said "It's the Tamar, not the Amazon, for Heaven's sake." Around 500 people gathered at a rally in Saltash organised by its mayor, Adam Killeya. Guest speakers included Conservative MP Sheryll Murray, Liberal Democrat MP Steve Gilbert, and Mebyon Kernow councillor and deputy leader Andrew Long. Speaking to the crowds, Steve Gilbert said that "This is Cornwall and over there, that's England. When David Cameron said this is not the Amazon he was right... it's much more important." On the same day the Cornish and Celtic campaigner Michael Chappell announced that he would be going on hunger strike over the boundary issue.

During the bill's second reading in the House of Commons, Nick Clegg said that the bill would help "restore people's faith in the way they elect their MPs" while Shadow Deputy Prime Minister Jack Straw called it "deeply flawed and partisan".

In October 2010, the House of Commons Political and Constitutional Reform Select Committee reported on the bill.
