= Electoral Registration and Administration Act 2013 =

Act of the Parliament of the United Kingdom

Electoral Registration and Administration Act 2013 (Note: Section 28.)
- Act of Parliament
- Parliament of the United Kingdom
- Long title: An Act to make provision about the registration of electors and the administration and conduct of elections; and to amend section 3(2)(a) of the Parliamentary Constituencies Act 1986.
- Citation: 2013 c. 6
- Introduced by: Nick Clegg, Deputy Prime Minister (Commons); Lord Wallace of Saltarie, Lord-in-waiting (Lords)
- Territorial extent: United Kingdom (Note: Section 26.)

Dates
- Royal assent: 31 January 2013
- Commencement: Various (Note: Section 27.)
Other legislation
Amends	Representation of the People Act 1983; Representation of the People Act 1985; Parliamentary Constituencies Act 1986; Representation of the People Act 2000; Political Parties, Elections and Referendums Act 2000; Electoral Administration Act 2006; Northern Ireland (Miscellaneous Provisions) Act 2006; Political Parties and Elections Act 2009
Amended by	Sentencing Act 2020; Parliamentary Constituencies Act 2020; Dissolution and Calling of Parliament Act 2022; Elections Act 2022; Criminal Justice Act 2003 (Commencement No. 33) and Sentencing Act 2020 (Commencement No. 2) Regulations 2022; Judicial Review and Courts Act 2022 (Magistrates’ Court Sentencing Powers) Regulations 2023; Elections and Elected Bodies (Wales) Act 2024

Status: Amended

History of passage through Parliament

Text of statute as originally enacted

Revised text of statute as amended

The Electoral Registration and Administration Act 2013 (c. 6) is an act of the Parliament of the United Kingdom which amended electoral law in the United Kingdom. It introduced Individual Electoral Registration (IER).

The Westminster government had introduced IER to Northern Ireland in 2002 in the Electoral Fraud (Northern Ireland) Act 2002, but England, Wales and Scotland continued to use a system of householder registration.

With the Sixth Periodic Review of Westminster constituencies in some doubt following the collapse of the House of Lords Reform Bill 2012, there had been some criticism of the money spent on boundary reviews whilst also favouring introducing IER. The Electoral Commission suggested that there could be a severe drop in turnout as a result. Section 6 of the Act effectively postponed the Sixth Periodic Review until "not before 1 October 2018".

There are three parts to the act.

== Part 1: Individual Electoral Registration in Great Britain ==
This part has twelve sections, which introduce and set the administrative structure for IER. The Act amends the Representation of the People Act 1983 and the Representation of the People Act 2000.

Alterations and improvements to the annual canvass of voters are introduced in this part.

== Part 2: Administration and Conduct of Elections etc ==
This part alters the timetable of parliamentary elections, modifies the timetable for civil parish elections in England and Wales, changes the regulations around the register of electors in specific circumstances, and alters the 1983 Representation of the People Act with regard to polling districts.

Section 18 introduces changes to existing regulations relating to the "inadequate performance" of returning officers.

Section 19 modifies the rules on joint ticket candidatures at elections, permitting the use of an emblem of one of the parties or a combined emblem on ballot papers.

Section 22 repeals from the provisions of the Electoral Administration Act 2006 for the setting up of a Coordinated Online Register of Electors.

== Part 3: Final Provisions ==
This section deals with the extent and name of the act.

== Proposed amendments ==
Committee stage discussion of the bill commenced on Monday 29 November. Amongst proposed amendments put forward for debate was a clause allowing for weekend voting, put forward by Lord Rennard and Lord Tyler.
