= Resident registration =

Government registry

A resident register is a government database which contains information on the current residence of persons. In countries where registration of residence is compulsory, the current place of residence must be reported to the registration office or the police within a few days after establishing a new residence. In some countries, residence information may be obtained indirectly from voter registers or registers of driver licenses. Besides a formal resident registers or population registers, residence information needs to be disclosed in many situations, such as voter registration, passport application, and updated in relation to drivers licenses, motor vehicle registration, and many other purposes. The permanent place of residence is a common criterion for taxation including the assessment of a person's income tax.

== Africa ==
=== South Africa ===
South Africa introduced the Population Registration Act in 1950, which created a national population register, and required the classification of residents based on race, and the issuing of identity cards. This system formed an important part in the pass laws, one of the dominant features of South Africa's apartheid system, after the Native Laws Amendment Act and the Abolition of Passes and Co-ordination of Documents Act of 1952 regularized their use. The apartheid system effectively ended in 1986.

== Americas ==
=== Canada ===
Canada does not have compulsory registration of residence, though residence information needs to be disclosed in many situations, such as voter registration, passport application, provincial health care card, and updated in relation to drivers licenses, motor vehicle registration, and many other purposes.

=== United States ===
Neither the federal government of the United States nor any U.S. state has formal resident registration systems. Refusing or neglecting to answer questions for the United States Census, such as current address, is punishable by fines of $100, for a property or business agent to fail to provide correct names for the census is punishable by fines of $500, and for a business agent to provide false answers for the census is punishable by fines of $10,000. Registrants in the Selective Service System (conscription in the United States) must notify Selective Service within 10 days of any changes to any of the information he provided on his registration card, like a change of address. In California, anyone with a driver's license must notify DMV of a change of address within 10 days or face a typical fine of $214, and anyone who has applied for or received a vehicle registration must notify DMV of a change of address within 10 days or face a typical fine of $178.

Voter registration has a residency requirement and is used for jury assignments and other government tasks.

A person's current address is often registered for state-issued identification cards and driver licenses. In some jurisdictions a "non-driver's license" or "non-driver photo identification card" is issued as a document containing residence details. Each state has their own requirements for keeping documents up-to-date and may require persons moving into the state to obtain a driver's license from that state within a given period of time (generally 10–90 days).

Aliens in the United States staying for more than thirty days are generally required to register with the Federal government pursuant to the Smith Act and carry proof of registration at all times; for permanent residents, the proof of registration comes in the form of a Permanent Residence Card ("Green card") while, for other aliens, this can be in the form of either an Employment Authorization Document (EAD) or the I-94 card together with a valid passport.

== Europe ==
=== European Union ===
Within the European Union a regulation for the European-wide census was agreed that allows for a register-based census that may use the continuously updated information from the national resident registers with a statistical correction drawn from a sample census performed at another magnitude of the census poll. The first register census was performed in 1981 in Denmark, joined later by other Nordic countries. Germany, Austria and Switzerland intend to use a register-based census model for the EU Census scheduled for 2011.

=== Austria ===
The residence reporting requirement (Meldepflicht) requires a change of address to be registered and deregistered within 3 days. The current place of residence is reported by means of a registration form (Meldezettel) sent to the local administrative authority (Gemeindeamt or Magistratisches Bezirksamt in cities).

On 1 March 2002 the regional resident registers were centrally stored on the newly established Zentrales Melderegister (ZMR). Some larger cities continue to run their own local resident registers (Lokales Melderegister or LMR), which are synchronized with the central database. A residence document from the database is called Meldeauskunft, and includes information about third persons unless those have filed to restrict public access (Auskunftsperre). As of 2006 the ZMR was extended to include additional personal details from the civil registers; It is envisaged to include records from even more government databases.

Permanent access to the ZMR is granted to some profession that require regular residence checks like lawyers, banks, professional associations and collection agencies.

=== Belgium ===
In Belgium, a change of address must be declared to the municipality within eight days of its occurrence. The municipality verifies the change of address by sending a police or municipal officer to the new address. If the change of residence is confirmed it is registered in the municipal and national registers and the resident or residents concerned must present themselves to the municipal administration to have their national identity card and any motor vehicle registration papers updated. The change of address is forwarded by the municipality to social security agencies.

=== Bosnia and Herzegovina ===
The compulsory resident register was handled separately by the regional offices even before Yugoslavia was split into sovereign states.

=== Denmark ===
The compulsory resident register is run by the folkeregister which hands out a CPR-Number (Central Person Register number). Foreigners need to register when intending to stay longer than three months, six month if they are from a Nordic, EU, EEA country or Switzerland.

=== Finland ===
The compulsory resident register is run by the Population Register Centre, a government agency that also hands out the Personal Identity Code, which consists of eleven characters: six digits for the birth date, one character for the birth century, three additional digits and a checksum character. Many companies and societies have registered for direct access to the resident register. Upon relocation, one only needs to declare the new address to the resident register and these companies will update their address registers accordingly. Although this makes it easier to handle the administrative tasks of taking a new home it has also been criticized for its lack of personal data privacy.

=== France ===
France utilizes a national identity card (carte nationale d’identité sécurisée or CNIS), an official non-compulsory identity document. The address information on the card is merely derived from other documents like electricity bills. There is no requirement to notify change of address, which leads to the situation that the current address is often verified by showing bills relating to the current home.

There are plans to introduce a new identity card (carte d'identité nationale électronique sécurisée or INES) that was to be implemented starting in 2007. The scheme bears many similarities to the British ID card. The new identity card which includes biometric data was approved by French government on March 14, 2021.

=== Germany ===
The registration of residents is a task of the municipality which do often create a separate resident registration offices to run the resident register (Einwohnermelderegister or Melderegister). The resident register is a public register in Germany — within the limits of resident privacy (Meldegeheimnis) laws and regulations. Since 2007, when moving between municipalities, the registration office will electronically de-register at the registration office of the old residency. The concept of the registered primary residence (Hauptwohnsitz) has special legal ramifications, primarily involving tax.

Although Germany (similarly to Austria and Switzerland) has a strict registration system for centuries, there had been a strong opposition towards a single identification number. All registration numbers were local to the Registration Office — even split within a single municipality into the Office for Civil Register, tax office, etc. In 2008 a new system was introduced with a national tax payer number. It is still debated how much more information will be attached to the national identification number when the federal resident register is activated.

Contrary to popular belief, there is no central administration of resident registration in Germany. The exception is the registration of resident aliens (see Central Register of Foreign Nationals). Registration is organized by 5283 local offices throughout Germany. Until 2009, the legal requirements pertaining to resident registration were governed by state legislation, which differed in terms of the period allowed to register a change of address (ranging from immediately to two weeks). Each state was able to produce its own laws and regulations governing access to personal information in the register and the fees for providing a residency document (Melderegisterauskunft) for oneself or for a third person.

The "Federalism Reform", which became effective on 1 September 2006, has moved the legislation for resident registration to the federal level. The Federal Ministry of the Interior was preparing a federal law to replace the state laws on resident registration which was scheduled to pass by 2010. The new law would assign that a Federal Resident Register (Bundesmelderegister) shall be created to be run in parallel with the local resident registers. The nationwide register shall assemble a number of personal identifying information drawing from multiple sources including resident registers, civil registers and taxation offices. During a scandal with list brokers obtaining large amounts of addresses from catalog selling company databases in 2008, the coalition split up over the question — Brigitte Zypries (SPD) opposed the plans of the Ministry of Interior led by Wolfgang Schäuble (CDU). She proposed that the current local registration offices should be networked instead. In the new government of CDU and FDP the plans are blocked, as such a central database is in clear opposition to the FDP's aim to increase data privacy.

=== Greece ===
Greece distributes resident registration responsibilities among several institutions, including the municipalities, the Independent Authority for Public Revenue (Greek: ΑΑΔΕ), the Hellenic Police, and the Ministry of Migration and Asylum (Greek: Υπουργείο Μετανάστευσης και Ασύλου). Ministry of the Interior (Greek: Υπουργείο Εσωτερικών) oversees municipal administration and aspects of the civil and municipal registration system. Municipalities (Greek: Δήμοι) maintain municipal records and provide certificates relating to permanent residence. Independent Authority for Public Revenue maintains tax-register information, including the residential address recorded for tax purposes. Hellenic Police handles registration certificates for qualifying EU, EEA, and Swiss citizens who reside in Greece beyond three months. Ministry of Migration and Asylum administers residence-permit procedures for third-country nationals.

EU citizens who plan to reside in Greece for a period of more than 90 days are required to register themselves at the Department of Foreigners (Greek: Πίνακας Αδειών Αλλοδαπών/Διεύθυνση Αλλοδαπών) located at the police stations, in the area of residency (Greek: Τμήμα Αλλοδαπών), where a Certificate of Registration (Greek: βεβαίωσης εγγραφής πολιτών της Ευρωπαϊκής Ένωση) in beige color is issued. According to the Greek law, EU citizens who do not register are subject to a fine. However, it is very rare that this certificate is ever requested. Some Greek authorities are not even aware of the European Union directive and do not know that this certificate exists. In many cases, the tax identification number (AFM) (Greek: (Αριθμός Φορολογικός Μητρώου (ΑΦΜ)) is used as proof of residency. EU citizens living in Greece for more than 5 years can apply for Permanent Residence Certificate (Greek: Eγγραφο Πιστοποίησης Μόνιμης Διαμονής Πολίτη).

=== Hungary ===
The compulsory resident register is run by Központi Adatfeldolgozó, Nyilvántartó és Választási Hivatal, Igazgatási és Felügyeleti Föösztály in Budapest. Hungarian citizens will declare their residency to the local administration while foreigners will register in the immigration office.

=== Iceland ===
Iceland has a central register of residents. Registration is compulsory.

=== Italy ===
In Italy the registration of residence is compulsory and the records are kept on a decentralized system. Unlike other countries a reported place of residence is physically checked by government officials as well as the de-registration of a previous residence. Hence, the official confirmation may take up to four months. Residents moving to a new place of residence abroad are recorded as expatriates on the database "Anagrafe degli Italiani Residenti all'Estero (A.I.R.E.)" (Registry of Italians Resident Abroad). When they return to Italy, they are de-registered from A.I.R.E and their new residence is registered by the local administrative authority.

A.I.R.E. enrolment is obligatory for citizens who take up residence in a foreign country for more than 12 months and for citizens residing abroad either as a result of being born there or having obtained Italian citizenship for any reason whatsoever. Enrolment in the A.I.R.E. is done by means of a declaration (special form available) made to the locally competent consular office within 90 days of transfer abroad.

=== Luxembourg ===
A change of address or move must be declared to the local authorities of the new place of residence within eight days (including arrivals by EU/EEA citizens). Non-EU citizens, however, must declare their arrival to the local authorities within three days, regardless of their intended duration of stay. A permanent or indefinite departure from Luxembourgish territory must also be declared to the local authorities no later than the day before the departure.

=== Netherlands ===
The Netherlands has had a compulsory resident register since 1 October 1850. On 1 October 1994 the paper-based “population register” was replaced by the computerized Municipal Personal Records Database (Gemeentelijke Basisadministratie Persoonsgegevens or GBA). Both the population register and the GBA were decentralized databases kept at municipal level.

On 6 January 2014, the GBA was replaced by the Dutch Key Register of Persons (Basisregistratie Personen or BRP). This is a centralized database containing personal data on residents and certain non-residents (i.e. those staying in the Netherlands for a maximum of 4 months). The BRP is updated in real time by all Dutch municipalities.

Most Dutch government bodies refer to the BRP as "Key Register of Persons" on their English-language web pages, but some still use part of the former name: “Personal Records Database”.

=== Norway ===
The Norwegian register of residents is Det sentrale folkeregisteret (DSF), otherwise commonly called Folkeregisteret. The English translation is the National Population Register.

This register is compulsory for all inhabitants of Norway, but foreigners only need to register when they intend to stay longer than 3 months.

The Norwegian Tax Administration is responsible for ensuring that the register is complete and up-to-date. The Register contains the following person information: birth date, name, paternity and parental responsibility, residence address, marital status, possible death date, citizenship and several other information elements. It tracks both the current value of these elements and historical versions. It is also used as basis for the tax register, the electoral register and is used for population statistics. Information from the Register is used by most other government agencies, such as the Norwegian Labour and Welfare Administration (NAV).

=== Romania ===
Romania utilizes the national identity card (carte de identitate or CI) system, based on an official compulsory identity document for the registration of all residents. The service is locally administered under the co-ordination of the Directorate for Persons Record and Databases Management (from the Ministers of Administration and Interior). There is a requirement to notify any change of address.

=== Russian Federation ===
Residence registration is compulsory in Russian Federation. There are separate registers for Russian citizens and foreign citizens or stateless persons, both administered by the Main Directorate for Migration Affairs which is a department of the Ministry of Internal Affairs. Anyone may request address information for a specific person from these registers, but a consent for the address disclosure from the latter is obligatory and will be checked by the register operator. In many cases government offices will refuse to provide services to people who are not registered in districts where these offices are located, although the law does not allow to do so to people who are not registered at all.

Russian citizens must register their permanent residence within 7 days, temporary residence must be registered after staying in the same place for more than 90 days.

Foreign citizens and stateless persons who have residence permits are obliged to register their permanent residence within 7 days. Temporary residence of foreign citizens and stateless persons is registered on an application from their host (including an employer, hotel administration, etc.). Such an application should be filed within 7 days.

Applications are delivered to Main Directorate for Migration Affairs offices by communal services companies, by applicants themselves, by post or by means of electronic government.

Russian citizens who fail to register in time can be fined 2000-2500 rubles ($70–$80). Russian hosts who fail to register their foreign guests in time can be fined 2000-500000 rubles ($70–$17000). Foreign citizens who fail to register in time can be fined 2000-5000 rubles ($70–$170).

=== Serbia ===
The compulsory resident register was handled separately by the regional offices even before the Yugoslavia was split into sovereign states.

=== Sweden ===
The mandatory Swedish population register (folkbokföringsregister) is administered by the Swedish Tax Agency (Skatteverket), which also administers the Swedish personal identity number (personnummer), the national identification number.

Almost all companies have registered for direct access to the resident register like telephone companies, electricity companies and so on. This leads to the situation that upon relocation one does only need to declare the new address to the resident register and all bills will be rerouted automatically to the new location. Although this makes it easier to handle the administrative tasks of taking a new home it has also been criticized for its lack of personal data privacy.

=== Switzerland and Liechtenstein ===
The compulsory resident registration is called Einwohnerkontrolle (residents' control) in Liechtenstein and the German-speaking parts of Switzerland. The residents' registers are subject to the local authority named Einwohneramt (residency office), Einwohnerkontrolle (residents registry office) or Personenmeldeamt (persons' registration office). Foreign residents are subject to the federal residents' register run by the immigration office. Each relocation must be declared to the residents' register including notice of departure when moving abroad.

=== United Kingdom ===
In the United Kingdom there is no such resident registration. The head of a household was required to register eligible voters in the household, although mandatory individual registration pursuant to the Political Parties and Elections Act 2009 is planned. This changed with the implementation of the Individual Electoral Registration reform in 2014, this brought an end to the 'head of household' being able to register cohabitants, making voter registration in the UK an entirely individual task. Registration is mandatory pursuant to section 23 of the Representation of the People (England and Wales) Regulations 2001 (No. 341). Completion of the Census is mandatory pursuant to section 8 of the Census Act 1920.

The Identity Cards Act 2006 provided for the introduction of British ID cards which were to be linked to a system of resident registration which would also contain any information deemed necessary by the government; however, following the 2010 General Election this scheme was abolished by the Identity Documents Act 2010.

== Asia and Oceania ==
=== Australia ===
Australia does not have compulsory registration of residence, though residence information needs to be disclosed in many situations, such as voter registration, passport application, state health care card, and updated in relation to drivers licences, motor vehicle registration, and many other purposes.

=== China ===
In China the Hukou system is used for resident registration and civil registration. This system was inherited from imperial times and there is an interest to reform the legislation about it.

=== India ===
Some foreign nationals over the age of 16 are required to register themselves and submit additional documentation at the nearest Foreigners Registration Office within a specific time frame when arriving in India. Failure to register can result in fines, imprisonment, and removal from India.

=== Iran ===
Created in 1997 National population database keeps national identity code and postal address code. Citizens must register their legal residence address change before a twenty day window through www.sabteahval.ir this is then used in government, post services, administrative government organizations /agencies systems.

National immigration organization has a program to issue IDs.

=== Israel ===
In Israel, the Population Registry is done in accorance with virtue of the Population Registry Law of 1965 These functions are primarily administered by the Population and Immigration Authority (Hebrew: רשות האוכלוסין וההגירה), which operates under the Ministry of Interior. The registered address appears on the identity card's slip (Hebrew: ספח תעודת זהות).

Residency registration is important because government agencies use population records to identify individuals, communicate with residents, administer public services, and determine which administrative rules apply to them.

It is important to distinguish registration of a residential address from legal residency status. An Israeli citizen changing apartments usually needs to update an existing address record, whereas a foreign national seeking permission to reside in Israel may need a visa, temporary residence permit, or permanent residence status. Registering an address does not, by itself, grant citizenship or a right to reside in Israel.

The registry in Israel was introduced by the British Mandate and is based on a similar registry found in the United Kingdom as well as in other countries around the world.

The details that appear in the population registry also appear (for the most part) on the identity card. In fact, the identity card is nothing more than a document that lists details from the population registry.

In accordance with the Knesset Elections Law, the Voters' Register, which is a list of all those entitled to vote in Knesset elections, is derived from the Population Register. The polling station at which each person will vote is also determined based on their address in the Population Register. The Voters' Register records the surname of each voter, their first name, their father's or mother's name, their year of birth, their address and their identity number. Similar treatment is applied to local authority elections in accordance with the Local Authorities (Elections) Law.

In preparation for the elections, each party receives the voter register, in order to establish contact with the electorate.

The service of address registration is free. Applications can also be submitted through eligible self-service stations, in person at a Population Authority office, or by post.

For an ordinary move, the online procedure generally requires identification and completion of the digital application rather than routine submission of a lease.

Additional evidence or an in-person application may be required in specific cases, including:

- A further address change within the previous 12 months.
- Registration at a parent's or another person's address by an adult.
- Returning to an address previously recorded in the registry.
- Moving to certain small localities or to Eilat.
- Address changes involving particular guardianship or parental-custody circumstances.

=== Japan ===
Japanese citizens are required by law to submit a koseki to their applicable municipality. Foreign residents are not required to submit a koseki.

In Japan, all foreign residents and Japanese citizens are required by law to notify their place of residence to the municipality where they reside. Once registered, individuals are provided with a residency document, which is useful when applying for public services pertaining to the municipality.

When a foreign resident arrives in Japan and are staying for more than 90 days, they are provided with a Resident Card (在留カード, zairyū kādo) that contains information regarding their immigration status. These cards must be returned upon departure from Japan.

=== Pakistan ===
In Pakistan the NADRA system is used to record Pakistani families and the District Council system is used to record individual residents. Foreigners need to register within 90 days under the premises of the laws for alien registration in Pakistan that creates a separate database for alien residents.

=== Palestine ===
After the establishment of the Palestinian Authority, its Ministry of Civil Affairs began issuing identity cards with the approval of Israel, which transferred to it the database containing the identity numbers of residents of the territories and continues to assign the identity numbers. In 1996, Israel withdrew from this agreement, and since then it has controlled the Palestinian Population Registry, which is shared by the Gaza Strip and the West Bank. In cases of changes to the Population Registry, the Palestinian Authority can issue a certificate or supplement only after receiving Israeli approval. The Population Registry file is held by Israel, and on the basis of this information it is determined who is recognized as a Palestinian resident for the purpose of obtaining an entry permit to Israel. A Palestinian registered as a resident of the Gaza Strip is considered an illegal resident if he is in the West Bank.

=== South Korea ===
The resident registration number in South Korea consist of 13 digits that is also shown on the ID cards. Foreigners will receive a replacement number on their alien registration cards. The usage of the registration number is abundant including one third of the national internet websites require sign-up with the registration number and another third being unable to accept the alien registration card number.

== See also ==
- National identification number
- Schengen Information System
- Social Security number
