= Elections and Elected Bodies (Wales) Act 2024 =

Elections and Elected Bodies (Wales) Act 2024 (Note: Section 73.)
- Act of Senedd Cymru
- Senedd Cymru
- Long title: An Act of Senedd Cymru to make provision about electoral administration and registration in Wales; piloting of changes to the electoral system in Wales; the system for reviewing arrangements for local government in Wales; disqualifying community councillors from membership of Senedd Cymru; the corrupt practice of undue influence as it applies to Senedd Cymru elections and local government elections in Wales; and the functions and constitution of the Democracy and Boundary Commission Cymru.
- Citation: 2024 asc 5
- Introduced by: Mick Antoniw MS, Counsel General

Dates
- Royal assent: 9 September 2024
- Commencement: various (Note: Section 72.)

Other legislation
- Amends: Local Government Act 1972; Representation of the People Act 1983; Local Government and Housing Act 1989; School Standards and Framework Act 1998; Representation of the People Act 2000; Political Parties, Elections and Referendums Act 2000; Freedom of Information Act 2000; Education Act 2002; Electoral Administration Act 2006; Government of Wales Act 2006; Local Government (Wales) Measure 2011; Electoral Registration and Administration Act 2013; Democracy and Boundary Commission Cymru etc. Act 2013; Local Government (Wales) Act 2015Local Government and Elections (Wales) Act 2021; Senedd Cymru (Members and Elections) Act 2024

Status: Current legislation

History of passage through the Senedd

Text of statute as originally enacted

Revised text of statute as amended

Text of the Elections and Elected Bodies (Wales) Act 2024 as in force today (including any amendments) within the United Kingdom, from legislation.gov.uk.

The Elections and Elected Bodies (Wales) Act 2024 (asc 5) (Welsh: Deddf Etholiadau a Chyrff Etholedig (Cymru) 2024) is an act of Senedd Cymru that was introduced in October 2023 and received royal assent on 9 September 2024.

The act introduced numerous electoral reforms to Wales, including:

- legislating for automatic voter registration
- reforming the Local Democracy and Boundary Commission for Wales
- disqualifying members of the Senedd from having dual mandates in local government

== Background ==
In reviewing the Electoral Registration and Administration Act 2013, the post-legislative scrutiny select committee of the House of Lords, recommended automatic voter registration. The Electoral Reform Society had called for automatic voter registration. A report published by Unlock Democracy indicated support for electoral reform including automatic voter registration. The Electoral Commission published a report on electoral registers in the UK, detailing how automatic voter registration could be implemented.

After the 2021 Senedd election, there were five MSs who were also councillors. It was reported that members of the Senedd who were councillors had significantly reduced their attendance at council meetings since their election to the Senedd. Senedd Members have already been prohibited from also holding a dual mandate as a member of the UK Parliament since the passage of the Wales Act 2014.

The Senedd Cymru (Members and Elections) Act 2024 had renamed the Local Democracy and Boundary Commission for Wales to the Democracy and Boundary Commission Cymru.

== Provisions ==
The act allows for pilots for automatic voter registration for Senedd and Local Government elections. Registration for UK Parliament elections would not be affected, as they are a reserved matter.

The act allows ends the exemptions for members of the Senedd holding dual mandates (serving in two roles) as councillors.

The act establishes an electoral management board for the Democracy and Boundary Commission Cymru, which would be responsible for an elections information platform.

Under amendment by Adam Price, the act makes it an offence for a Senedd Member or a candidate in a Senedd election to "wilfully" and "with the intent to mislead" make, publish or permit to be published on their behalf a statement that purports to be a fact they know is false or deceptive.

== Passage ==
In written evidence during the passage of the bill, Electoral Reform Society Cymru declared their support for the bill.

In January 2021, the Legislation, Justice and Constitution Committee released a report recommending certain amendments to the bill.

The bill was passed by the Senedd on 9 July 2024. The Act received royal assent on 21 September 2024.

== Reaction ==
Electoral Reform Society Cymru described the Act alongside the Senedd Cymru (Members and Elections) Act 2024, as "bold steps" but that there was also "room to go further".

== See also ==
- Individual Electoral Registration
- Electoral Registration and Administration Act 2013
- Elections Act 2022
- Senedd Cymru (Members and Elections) Act 2024
