= Elections Act 2022 =

Act of the Parliament of the United Kingdom

Elections Act 2022 (Note: Section 68.)
- Act of Parliament
- Parliament of the United Kingdom
- Long title: An Act to make provision about the administration and conduct of elections, including provision designed to strengthen the integrity of the electoral process; about overseas electors; about voting and candidacy rights of EU citizens; about the designation of a strategy and policy statement for the Electoral Commission; about the membership of the Speaker's Committee; about the Electoral Commission's functions in relation to criminal proceedings; about financial information to be provided by a political party on applying for registration; for preventing a person being registered as a political party and being a recognised non-party campaigner at the same time; about regulation of expenditure for political purposes; about disqualification of offenders for holding elective offices; about information to be included in electronic campaigning material; and for connected purposes.
- Citation: 2022 c. 37
- Introduced by: Kemi Badenoch, Minister of State for Levelling Up Communities (Commons); Lord True, Minister of State for the Cabinet Office (Lords)
- Territorial extent: England and Wales; Scotland; Northern Ireland; (Note: Section 66.)

Dates
- Royal assent: 28 April 2022
- Commencement: Various (Note: Section 67.)
Other legislation
Amends	City of London (Various Powers) Act 1957; Electoral Law Act (Northern Ireland) 1962; Local Government Act (Northern Ireland) 1972; Local Government Act 1972; House of Commons Disqualification Act 1975; Representation of the People Act 1983; Elections (Northern Ireland) Act 1985; Representation of the People Act 1985; Local Elections (Northern Ireland) Order 1985; Elected Authorities (Northern Ireland) Act 1989; Local Government Elections (Changes to the Franchise and Qualification of Members) Regulations 1995; Finance Act 1996; Northern Ireland Act 1998; Greater London Authority Act 1999; Representation of the People Act 2000; Local Government Act 2000; Political Parties, Elections and Referendums Act 2000; Elections Act 2001; Local Elections (Northern Ireland) (Amendment) Order 2001; Northern Ireland Assembly (Elections) Order 2001; Electoral Fraud (Northern Ireland) Act 2002; Local Elections (Northern Ireland) (Amendment) Order 2005; Electoral Administration Act 2006; Government of Wales Act 2006; Armed Forces Act 2006; Income Tax Act 2007; Local Democracy, Economic Development and Construction Act 2009; Constitutional Reform and Governance Act 2010; Political Parties, Elections and Referendums (Civil Sanctions) Order 2010; Police Reform and Social Responsibility Act 2011; Electoral Registration and Administration Act 2013; Northern Ireland (Miscellaneous Provisions) Act 2014; House of Lords Reform Act 2014; Recall of MPs Act 2015; Sentencing Act 2020; Transfer of Functions (Secretary of State for Levelling Up, Housing and Communities) Order 2021
Repeals/revokes	Transfer of Functions (Speaker’s Committee) Order 2021
Amended by	Levelling-up and Regeneration Act 2023; Online Safety Act 2023; Scottish Elections (Representation and Reform) Act 2025; Senedd Cymru (Representation of the People) Order 2025; English Devolution and Community Empowerment Act 2026

Status: Amended

History of passage through Parliament

Text of statute as originally enacted

Revised text of statute as amended

The Elections Act 2022 (c. 37) is an act of the Parliament of the United Kingdom that was introduced to the House of Commons in July 2021, and received royal assent on 28 April 2022. The act made photo identification compulsory for in-person voting in Great Britain for the first time. Before the act was passed, Northern Ireland had been the only part of the UK to require voter identification. The act also gave the government new powers over the independent elections regulator; the Electoral Commission said it was "concerned" about its independence from political influence in the future.

According to academic research presented to the House of Commons in 2021, these changes were expected to result in 1.1 million fewer voters at the subsequent general election due to the photo ID requirement. Key elements of the act were opposed by parliamentary committees, the House of Lords, the Electoral Commission, devolved governments, and academics. Amendments proposed by the House of Lords were rejected by the government.

The legislation was highly contentious. Some opponents said it would hinder certain groups of people from voting, because they were less likely to have photo IDs. The Liberal Democrat peer Lord Wallace described it as a "nefarious piece of legislation" that was "shabby and illiberal". Toby James, a professor of politics and public policy, said that "the inclusiveness of elections has been undermined by the act and it weakens the UK's claim to be a beacon of democracy". The Labour Party said the Conservatives were "trying to rig the rules of the game to help themselves". A free voter ID card was introduced for those who did not have other forms of identification.

The act also briefly changed mayoral and police and crime commissioner elections from a supplementary vote (SV) system to a first-past-the-post (FPTP) system, which critics said was an attempt by the ruling Conservative Party to make it easier for them to win future contests without getting a majority of the total votes, most particularly in London (as a plurality would suffice for a victory).

== Background ==
Many countries have voter identification laws. Since the passing of the Electoral Fraud (Northern Ireland) Act 2002, photographic identification has been mandatory to vote in elections in Northern Ireland, which is part of the UK. Other countries with voter ID laws tend to also have compulsory national identity cards, whereas the UK does not (the Labour government of Tony Blair attempted to introduce them, on the legal basis of the Identity Cards Act 2006, but this was abandoned by the subsequent Conservative/Liberal Democrat coalition government and the act was repealed in 2011).

The government's research suggested that 9% of voters in Great Britain did not have eligible identification. A lack of eligible identification was more common in individuals who were disabled, unemployed, or without educational qualifications. In response to this, the government announced that identification which had a photograph in which the likeness was similar would be permissible even if the identification in question had expired, which they stated would reduce the percentage of eligible voters without any form of eligible identification to 4% based on their research.

There is little evidence of serious voter fraud in UK elections. Between 2015 and 2019, a period during which three general elections were held and 153 million in-person votes cast, only 88 allegations of voter fraud were made. Between 2010 and 2018, there were just two convictions for voter fraud.

A voter ID trial was held for the 2018 United Kingdom local elections by the national Conservative government. Voters in five local authorities in England (Bromley, Gosport, Swindon, Watford and Woking) were required to show ID before voting. The legal basis for the trial was contested but upheld in R (on the application of Coughlan) v Minister for the Cabinet Office.

Another voter ID trial was held in 10 authorities for the 2019 United Kingdom local elections. Examining Cabinet Office and Electoral Commission evaluations Michela Palese, Research and Policy Officer for the Electoral Reform Society, concluded that mandatory voter ID posed a larger risk to democratic access and equality than the levels of personation at the ballot box.

Voter ID legislation was part of the 2021 Queen's Speech.

On 16 January 2023, the Voter Authority Certificate service was launched, allowing UK electors to obtain a free form of photo ID exclusively for voting. The Electoral Commission also launched a campaign to raise awareness about ID requirements, with public awareness going from 22% in December 2022 to 63% in February 2023 and 76% in April 2023.

== Provisions ==
Notable provisions of the act include:

- Requiring photo identification to vote in-person for general and by-elections to the House of Commons, Police and Crime Commissioner elections and local and mayoral elections in England. Local and devolved elections in Scotland and Wales are not affected.
- Ability for government ministers to provide a "strategy and policy statement", containing government priorities for elections, to the Electoral Commission. Commissioners must have due regard for the statement and publish annual reports explaining what actions they have taken to implement it.
- Changes to the Electoral Commission, including placing it under the supervision of a government minister. It was previously independent of government and accountable directly to parliament.
- Changing mayoral and police and crime commissioner elections from a supplementary vote system to a first-past-the-post one.
- Removing the restriction on British citizens who have been resident overseas for more than 15 consecutive years from voting in UK elections.
- Changes to voter eligibility of EU citizens. EU citizens living in the UK before 1 January 2021 will be allowed to vote in future UK local elections. EU citizens arriving in the UK after that date will only be allowed to vote if there is a reciprocal agreement for UK citizens resident in that country.

Other provisions include extending the current imprint rules onto digital election material, and tightening spending limits on third parties.

== Criticism ==
The act was criticised for allowing as voter identification "an Older Person's Bus Pass, an Oyster 60+ Card, a Freedom Pass", while not allowing 18+ student Oyster cards, national railcards, or student ID cards. An amendment in the House of Lords to list these as accepted forms of voter identification was rejected by the Conservative government. Critics said the list discriminated against younger people, who more often vote Labour; in the 2019 United Kingdom general election 56% of voters aged 18–24 voted Labour whereas 67% of voters aged over 70 voted Conservative, according to polling by YouGov. The Labour Party thus accused the Conservative government of trying to "choose voters". The government said that these forms of ID were rejected on the grounds that, compared to their equivalents for older citizens, they have less stringent application requirements and so were less secure.

A column in The National said the real intention is to make it harder to vote for "certain demographic groups which tend not to support the Conservatives". It said that young voters, and ethnic minorities, are more likely not to have photo ID.

Conversely, Conservative MP Jacob Rees-Mogg said the law had mostly prevented the elderly from voting, arguing that this was a reason for Conservative losses in the 2023 local elections:

Parties that try and gerrymander end up finding their clever scheme comes back to bite them, as dare I say we found by insisting on voter ID for elections. We found the people who didn't have ID were elderly and they by and large voted Conservative. So we made it hard for our own voters and we upset a system that worked perfectly well.

Rees-Mogg's comments were criticised by Liberal Democrat MP Helen Morgan, who argued they were an admission that voter ID was introduced strategically to disenfranchise non-Conservative voters. Conservative MP Danny Kruger argued that Rees-Mogg's comments were in the context of criticising proposals by the Labour Party to expand the franchise to 16-year-olds and EU citizens, with Kruger suggesting it was meant to be a facetious comparison. Morgan raised the issue as a point of order in the House of Commons, arguing that it contradicted prior comments by Lee Rowley, Parliamentary Under-Secretary of State for Local Government and Building Safety, before the House on why voter ID was being introduced by the government. Rowley issued an official response to the point of order, stating that Rees-Mogg's comments were irrelevant to the government's motives for introducing the change.

The government's argument that voter ID should be introduced to lessen public concern about vote fraud (with two-thirds of voters reporting concern about such fraud) was criticised by the Public Administration and Constitutional Affairs Committee on the grounds that the public tends to exaggerate the problem. Data from the Electoral Commission showed that of the 1,462 cases of alleged electoral fraud reported to police between 2019 and 2023, only 10 led to convictions, and the police issued 4 cautions.

Bob Kerslake, former Head of the Home Civil Service, claimed the changes to mayoral and police elections were motivated by a perceived advantage the Conservatives have under first-past-the-post due to vote splitting. Kerslake noted that of the past ten metro mayors, only two have been Conservative.

The Electoral Commissioners wrote to government ministers urging for the independence of the commission to be retained. The letter said "it is our firm and shared view that [...] enabling the government to guide the work of the commission is inconsistent with the role that an independent electoral commission plays in a healthy democracy". It added that "the Statement has no precedent in the accountability arrangements of electoral commissions in other comparable democracies, such as Canada, Australia or New Zealand."

Following the passing of the act law firm Mishcon de Reya said that the Strategy and Policy Statement "has created the potential for existing and future Governments to enhance its electoral prospects".

== Impact ==
In an effort to prevent the disenfranchisement of student voters, the National Union of Students partnered with CitizenCard to offer a free card with the PASS hologram to students and young people. Cards with the PASS hologram are accepted as a form of voter ID, but many other identification cards held by students and young people, such as Oyster 18+ cards and student cards issued by universities, are not.

=== 2023 local elections ===
Ahead of the May 2023 local elections, it was reported that only 10,000 people had applied for the Voter Authority Certificate, which was just 0.5% of the 2 million people identified as likely lacking any acceptable photo ID.

A study by the Electoral Commission found that at least 14,000 people had been stopped from voting at polling stations in the 2023 local elections because they lacked the required ID. It assumed that the real number was significantly higher than this, because around 40% of polling stations had "greeters" to ensure people trying to vote had the correct ID, and all had notices explaining the new rules; so that people who gave up at that point would not have been recorded in the 14,000. The Commission stated that there were "concerning" signs that voters with disabilities, unemployed people and people from particular ethnic groups could be disproportionately affected by the new ID rules. The commission also carried out separate polling which found that 4% of the people who did not vote did not do so because of the new ID rules. It estimated that at least 400,000 people could not or chose not to vote due to the new ID rules.

=== 2024 local elections ===
Ahead of the May 2024 local elections, research carried out by YouGov found that one in seven (or 14%) British people were unaware of the requirement to have an acceptable form of photo ID in order to vote. Outliers included people aged 18 to 24, of whom 30% were unaware, and people living in Scotland, of whom 34% were unaware, although voter ID is not required in order to vote in Scottish local elections.

In the 2024 local elections former Prime Minister Boris Johnson, whose government introduced the act, was turned away by staff at his local polling station when he attempted to use a copy of the Prospect magazine as a form of identification. It was reported that he was later permitted to vote when he returned with his driving licence. Additionally, the Conservative MP for Ipswich Tom Hunt misplaced his passport and was forced to ask local Conservative members to find someone to act as an emergency proxy. He later explained that the loss was due to his dyspraxia.

At least one veteran was turned away after attempting to use their veteran's ID card as a form of voter ID. In response, Veterans Minister Johnny Mercer apologised and pledged to have veterans' ID cards added to the list of acceptable voter ID.

=== 2024 general election ===
The 2024 general election that July was the first under this act, which returned a Labour majority after 14 years in opposition. Almost two million people in that election failed to vote for lacking any recognised ID card.

== See also ==
- Electoral reform § United Kingdom
- NO2ID
