= Political Parties, Elections and Referendums Act 2000 =

Act of the Parliament of the United Kingdom

Political Parties, Elections and Referendums Act 2000 (Note: Section 163(1).)
- Act of Parliament
- Parliament of the United Kingdom
- Long title: An Act to establish an Electoral Commission; to make provision about the registration and finances of political parties; to make provision about donations and expenditure for political purposes; to make provision about election and referendum campaigns and the conduct of referendums; to make provision about election petitions and other legal proceedings in connection with elections; to reduce the qualifying periods set out in sections 1 and 3 of the Representation of the People Act 1985; to make pre-consolidation amendments relating to European Parliamentary Elections; and for connected purposes.
- Citation: 2000 c. 41
- Introduced by: Jack Straw, Secretary of State for the Home Department (Commons)
- Territorial extent: United Kingdom (Note: Section 163(8)–(10))

Dates
- Royal assent: 30 November 2000
- Commencement: Various (Note: Section 163(2)–(6))
Other legislation
Amends	House of Commons Disqualification Act 1975; Representation of the People Act 1985; Government of Wales Act 1998; Scotland Act 1998; See § Repealed enactments
Repeals/revokes	See § Repealed enactments
Amended by	European Parliamentary Elections Act 2002; Communications Act 2003; Local Government Act 2003; Local Government in Scotland Act 2003; European Parliamentary Elections (Combined Region and Campaign Expenditure) (United Kingdom and Gibraltar) Order 2004; Local Governance (Scotland) Act 2004; Scottish Parliament (Constituencies) Act 2004; Local Electoral Administration and Registration Services (Scotland) Act 2006; Electoral Administration Act 2006; Government of Wales Act 2006; Northern Ireland (Miscellaneous Provisions) Act 2006; Companies Act 2006; Political Parties, Elections and Referendums Act 2000 (Northern Ireland Political Parties) Order 2007; Statistics and Registration Service Act 2007; Companies Act 2006 (Consequential Amendments etc.) Order 2008; Electoral Administration Act 2006 (Regulation of Loans etc: Northern Ireland) Order 2008; Political Parties, Elections and Referendums Act 2000 (Northern Ireland Political Parties) Order 2008; European Parliamentary Elections (Loans and Related Transactions and Miscellaneous Provisions) (United Kingdom and Gibraltar) Order 2009; Companies Act 2006 (Consequential Amendments, Transitional Provisions and Savings) Order 2009; Political Parties and Elections Act 2009; Local Democracy, Economic Development and Construction Act 2009; Local Education Authorities and Children's Services Authorities (Integration of Functions) Order 2010; Lord President of the Council Order 2010; Local Electoral Administration (Scotland) Act 2011; Parliamentary Voting System and Constituencies Act 2011; Postal Services Act 2011; Police Reform and Social Responsibility Act 2011; Fixed-term Parliaments Act 2011; Police and Crime Commissioner Elections Order 2012; Tribunals, Courts and Enforcement Act 2007 (Consequential Amendments) Order 2012; Scotland Act 2012; Police and Fire Reform (Scotland) Act 2012 (Consequential Provisions and Modifications) Order 2013; Crime and Courts Act 2013; Electoral Registration and Administration Act 2013; Transparency of Lobbying, Non-Party Campaigning and Trade Union Administration Act 2014; Northern Ireland (Miscellaneous Provisions) Act 2014; Co-operative and Community Benefit Societies Act 2014; Legal Aid, Sentencing and Punishment of Offenders Act 2012 (Fines on Summary Conviction) Regulations 2015; Chancellor of the Duchy of Lancaster Order 2015; European Parliamentary Elections (Miscellaneous Provisions) (United Kingdom and Gibraltar) Order 2015; Deregulation Act 2015; Recall of MPs Act 2015; Transfer of Functions (Elections, Referendums, Third Sector and Information) Order 2016; Interests of Members of the Scottish Parliament (Amendment) Act 2016; Scotland Act 2016; Investigatory Powers Act 2016; Wales Act 2017; Transparency of Donations and Loans etc. (Northern Ireland Political Parties) Order 2018; European Parliamentary Elections Etc. (Repeal, Revocation, Amendment and Saving Provisions) (United Kingdom and Gibraltar) (EU Exit) Regulations 2018; Data Protection Act 2018; Scottish Parliament (Elections etc.) (Miscellaneous Amendments) Order 2020; Representation of the People (Election Expenses Exclusion) (Wales) (Amendment) Order 2020; Senedd and Elections (Wales) Act 2020; Scottish Elections (Reform) Act 2020; Transfer of Functions (Secretary of State for Levelling Up, Housing and Communities) Order 2021; Local Government and Elections (Wales) Act 2021; Scottish Local Government Elections Amendment Order 2022; Dissolution and Calling of Parliament Act 2022; Elections Act 2022; Judicial Review and Courts Act 2022 (Magistrates' Court Sentencing Powers) Regulations 2023; Representation of the People (Variation of Election Expenses, Expenditure Limits and Donation etc. Thresholds) Order 2023; National Security Act 2023; Representation of the People (Variation of Election Expenses and Exclusions) Regulations 2024; Transfer of Functions (Secretary of State for Housing, Communities and Local Government) Order 2024; Senedd Cymru (Members and Elections) Act 2024; Elections and Elected Bodies (Wales) Act 2024; Scottish Parliament (Elections etc.) (Miscellaneous Amendments) Order 2025; Political Parties, Elections and Referendums Act 2000 (Exclusions and Variation of Campaign Expenditure Limits) (Wales) Regulations 2025; Scottish Elections (Representation and Reform) Act 2025; Senedd Cymru (Member Accountability and Elections) Act 2026

Status: Amended

Text of statute as originally enacted

Revised text of statute as amended

The Political Parties, Elections and Referendums Act 2000 (c. 41) is an act of the Parliament of the United Kingdom that sets out how political parties, elections and referendums are to be regulated in the United Kingdom. It formed an important part of the constitutional reform programme implemented by the 1997 Labour Government under Tony Blair, building on the Registration of Political Parties Act 1998 (c. 48) which was passed two years earlier.

== Background ==
The act was introduced after consultation with major political parties, and largely followed the recommendations of the Committee on Standards in Public Life (known at the time as the "Neill Committee" after its chairman), an independent body set-up by former Prime Minister John Major to consider ways of making politics more transparent. The committee set out its proposals in its report, The Funding of Political Parties in the United Kingdom.

== Provisions ==
The act created an independent Electoral Commission to regulate political parties and their funding arrangements. It also required parties to submit statements of their accounts on a regular basis, and prohibited the receipt of funds from foreign or anonymous donors. Restrictions on campaign expenditure were also put in place, dictating the maximum amount that parties were able to spend.

=== Registration of parties ===
The law gave the newly formed Electoral Commission a role in controlling the registration of political parties.

The requirement for parties to register with an official body, if they wished to be named on ballot papers, was the result of a fairly wide acceptance that the finances of political groups should be regulated to reduce the perception of underhand dealings.

In addition, political groups or individuals failing to register with the commission would only be able to describe themselves as "Independent" on ballot papers, or else have a blank space instead of a description after their names—with the single exception of the Speaker of the House of Commons who is entitled to be described as: "The Speaker seeking re-election".

This built on the provisions of the Registration of Political Parties Act 1998, passed amid concern about voters being fooled by misleading ballot descriptions.

There is an annual fee for the registration of a political party.

=== Donations ===
Under the terms of the law, registered political parties are only allowed to accept donations in excess of £500 from "permissible donors", defined as either individuals on an electoral register in the United Kingdom, or political parties, companies, trade unions, or similar organisations that are registered in the country.

The provision of non-financial support to a registered party – such as subsidies or free materials – is counted as a donation. Each party is required to submit details of all donations received, whether by party headquarters or their subsidiary parts. Each report must provide sufficient information to show that a donor counts as a "permissible source".

Political parties on the separate register for Northern Ireland are exempt from the controls on accepting and reporting donations.

=== Expenditure ===
The act places strict limits on the amount each party may spend in the campaign period for the election or referendum.

As of 2024, the limit for elections to the UK Parliament in Westminster stands at £54,010 per constituency contested; this would reach a maximum of £34.13 million for parties contesting all 632 seats in Great Britain. This spending limit applies within 365 days of a general election. These spending limits were last increased in November 2023 by the Representation of the People (Variation of Election Expenses, Expenditure Limits and Donation etc. Thresholds) Order 2023 (SI 2023/1235).

The amount permitted to be spent by third-parties during parliamentary elections to support or oppose candidates was increased from the previous limit of £5 (which had been held to be an impermissible restriction on freedom of expression by the European Convention on Human Rights in the case of Bowman v United Kingdom) to £500.

=== Referendums ===
The act provides a basic framework to the running of all future referendums that are to be held under the jurisdiction of the Electoral Commission in pursuance of any provision made by a subsequent act of Parliament in the following areas:

- United Kingdom
  - England
  - Northern Ireland
  - Scotland
  - Wales

The act also makes the provision that in any future UK-wide referendum the chairperson of the Electoral Commission is appointed "Chief Counting Officer" for the United Kingdom or gives the power for the chairperson to appoint a Chief Counting Officer.

=== Repealed enactments ===
Section 158(2) of the act repealed 15 enactments, listed in schedule 22 to the act.

Chapter	Short title	Extent of repeal
1975 c. 24	House of Commons Disqualification Act 1975	In Part III of Schedule 1, the entry relating to Boundary Commissioners and assistant Commissioners appointed under Schedule 1 to the Parliamentary Constituencies Act 1986.
1975 c. 25	Northern Ireland Assembly Disqualification Act 1975	In Part III of Schedule 1, the entry relating to Boundary Commissioners and Assistant Boundary Commissioners appointed under Schedule 1 to the Parliamentary Constituencies Act 1986.
1983 c. 2	Representation of the People Act 1983	Section 72. In section 73, subsection (4), and in subsection (6) the words from ", or pays" to "as mentioned above,". Section 75(1B) and (1C). Section 78(6). Section 79(3). In section 81, subsection (4), in subsection (7) the words from "; and" onwards, and subsection (11). Section 82(4). Section 86(9). Sections 101 to 105. Section 106(8). Section 108. Section 122(8). In section 138(1), the words from ", a copy of which" onwards. Sections 148 to 153. Section 157(5). Section 159(2). Section 167(4). Section 174(6). In section 201(1), the words from "and except" to "section 29(8)". In Schedule 1, in rule 30(5), the words from the beginning to "agents, and". In Schedule 3— (a) the form of return, and (b) in the form of declarations, the words in paragraph 3 "in relation to my [the candidate's] personal expenses" and paragraph 4.
1985 c. 50	Representation of the People Act 1985	Section 14(3) to (5). In Schedule 3, paragraphs 6 and 7. In Schedule 4, paragraph 35.
1986 c. 56	Parliamentary Constituencies Act 1986	Section 2. Section 4(2). Schedule 1. In Schedule 2, in paragraph 8, the words "for which there is a Boundary Commission".
1989 c. 28	Representation of the People Act 1989	Section 6(1)(b) and (2).
1991 c. 11	Representation of the People Act 1991	The whole act.
1992 c. 19	Local Government Act 1992	In section 13(1C), paragraph (b) and the "and" preceding it. Section 13(3) and (4).
1992 c. 55	Boundary Commissions Act 1992	Section 1. Section 2(1) to (3). Section 3(2) and (3).
1996 c. 55	Broadcasting Act 1996	In Schedule 10, paragraph 29, and in paragraph 30 "or 29".
1998 c. 38	Government of Wales Act 1998	In section 11(2)(c), the words "and registered political parties".
1998 c. 46	Scotland Act 1998	In section 12(2)(c), the words "and registered political parties".
1998 c. 48	Registration of Political Parties Act 1998	The whole act, except for sections 13, 15, 24 and 26 and Schedule 2.
1999 c. 29	Greater London Authority Act 1999	In Schedule 3, paragraphs 16, 19(4), 21, 24(5), 28, 31 and 35.
2000 c. 2	Representation of the People Act 2000	In Schedule 6, paragraph 4.

== Controversy ==
In December 2006 Prime Minister Tony Blair and politicians of other parties were questioned by police as part of their investigation into the Cash for Honours affair. Part of their time was said to be spent looking at whether the act had been breached by parties taking loans from supporters in return for nominations to the House of Lords. Unlike donations, loans did not have to be made public as long as they were made on "commercial terms".

The government later changed the law to require the declaration of all forms of loan, and asked a former Clerk of the Crown in Chancery, Sir Hayden Phillips, to undertake a fundamental review of party funding arrangements. He reported in 2008.

In November 2007 the provisions of the act were again the subject of scrutiny in the cases of Labour party donor David Abrahams and Scottish Labour leader Wendy Alexander.

In 2016, several UK police forces started investigations into allegations of election fraud during the 2015 general election, specifically on allegations that the Conservatives breached the spending limits. The majority of allegations focus on the misrepresentation of the "battle-bus" finances.

== See also ==
- List of political parties in the United Kingdom
- Elections in the United Kingdom
- Campaign finance
