= Representation of the People Act 1985 =

Act of the Parliament of the United Kingdom

Representation of the People Act 1985 (Note: Section 29(1).)
- Act of Parliament
- Parliament of the United Kingdom
- Long title: An Act to amend the law relating to parliamentary elections in the United Kingdom and local government elections in Great Britain, to provide for combining polls taken on the same date at such elections and elections to the Assembly of the European Communities, to extend the franchise at elections to that Assembly, to amend the law relating to the effect of the demise of the Crown on the summoning and duration of a new Parliament and to repeal section 21(3) of the Representation of the People Act 1918.
- Citation: 1985 c. 50
- Territorial extent: United Kingdom

Dates
- Royal assent: 16 July 1985
- Commencement: 16 July 1985 (Note: Section 4(b) of the Interpretation Act 1978.)
Other legislation
Amends	Meeting of Parliament Act 1797; Representation of the People Act 1918; City of London (Various Powers) Act 1957; Local Government Act 1972; Representation of the People Act 1983; Police and Criminal Evidence Act 1984; Elections (Northern Ireland) Act 1985
Repeals/revokes	Representation of the People Act 1918
Amended by	Finance Act 1985; Law Reform (Miscellaneous Provisions) (Scotland) Act 1985; European Communities (Amendment) Act 1986; Elected Authorities (Northern Ireland) Act 1989; Representation of the People Act 1989; Statute Law (Repeals) Act 1989; Representation of the People Act 1990; Welsh Language Act 1993; Local Government (Wales) Act 1994; Local Government Elections (Changes to the Franchise and Qualification of Members) Regulations 1995; European Parliamentary Elections Act 1999; Representation of the People Act 2000; Elections Act 2001; Political Parties, Elections and Referendums Act 2000; Electoral Fraud (Northern Ireland) Act 2002; Secretary of State for Constitutional Affairs Order 2003; Civil Partnership Act 2004 (Overseas Relationships and Consequential, etc. Amendments) Order 2005; Electoral Administration Act 2006; Parliamentary Voting System and Constituencies Act 2011; Fixed-term Parliaments Act 2011; Electoral Registration and Administration Act 2013; Northern Ireland (Miscellaneous Provisions) Act 2014; Anonymous Registration (Northern Ireland) Order 2014; Scotland Act 2016; Wales Act 2017; European Parliamentary Elections Etc. (Repeal, Revocation, Amendment and Saving Provisions) (United Kingdom and Gibraltar) (EU Exit) Regulations 2018; Representation of the People (Electronic Communications and Amendment) (Northern Ireland) Regulations 2018; Representation of the People (Electronic Communications and Amendment) (Northern Ireland) Regulations 2018; Local Government and Elections (Wales) Act 2021; Transfer of Functions (Secretary of State for Levelling Up, Housing and Communities) Order 2021; Elections Act 2022; Dissolution and Calling of Parliament Act 2022

Status: Amended

Text of statute as originally enacted

Revised text of statute as amended

Text of the Representation of the People Act 1985 as in force today (including any amendments) within the United Kingdom, from legislation.gov.uk.

The Representation of the People Act 1985 (c. 50) is an act of the Parliament of the United Kingdom concerning electoral law.

== Provisions ==
The act allows British citizens who are resident outside the United Kingdom to qualify as "overseas electors" in the constituency for which they were last registered for a period of five years after they have left (this was subsequently changed to 20 years, then 15 years, before being made unlimited). Expatriate electors were able to register as overseas electors at British consular posts, starting in the summer of 1986. When registered, expatriate voters were eligible to vote by proxy at any Parliamentary or European Parliament elections which were held after the 1987 register came into force on 16 February 1987. It was estimated that half-a-million British expatriates were enfranchised by the Act.

The act also made British people abroad on holiday eligible to vote by postal ballot or by proxy, as well as those who were not reasonably expected to be able to by being physically present at the polling station.

The act modified the rules concerning deposits in Parliamentary elections. Previously the deposit had been £150 and was under this Act raised to £500. The percentage of votes needed to retain the deposit was lowered from 12½% to 5%. The deposit for election to the European Parliament was raised from £600 to £700.

The act allows for the delaying of a general election by up two weeks with the new government (the monarch under the advice of the prime minister) having the ability to vary this by up to two weeks in each direction.

== See also ==
- Reform Acts
- Representation of the People Act
