= Population and Immigration Authority =

Israeli government agency

- רשות האוכלוסין וההגירה

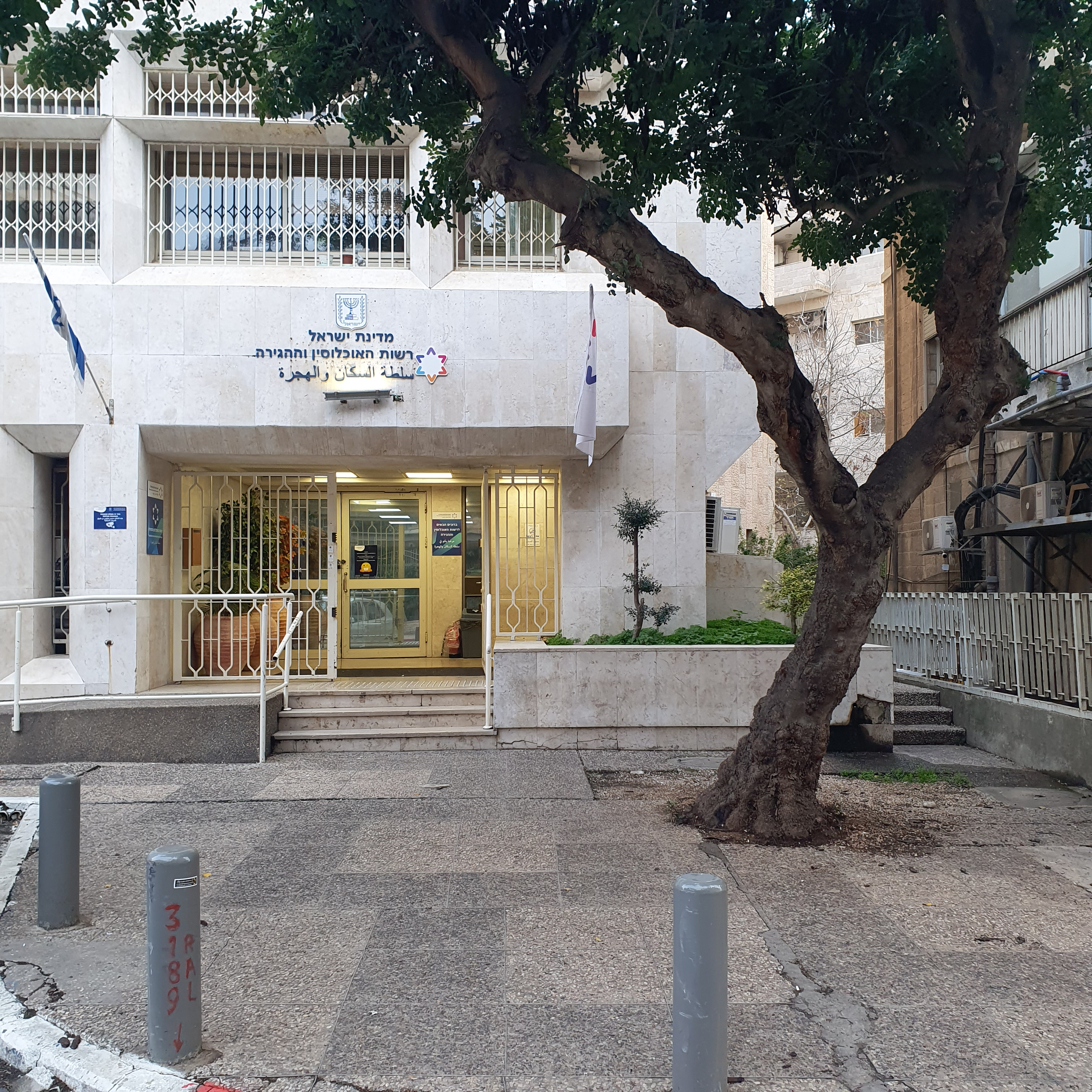

Agency overview
- Formed: 2008
- Jurisdiction: Government of Israel
- Headquarters: Mesilat Yesharim St 6, Jerusalem; 31°46′52″N 35°12′52″E
- Agency executive: Boaz Yosef, Director-General
- Parent agency: Ministry of Interior
- Website: www.piba.gov.il

The Population and Immigration Authority (Hebrew: רשות האוכלוסין וההגירה; PIBA), is an Israeli government agency which was established on July 23, 2008 and is subordinated to the Ministry of Interior. It is responsible for population registry and immigration topics and border control. In addition, the Population and Immigration Authority closely cooperates with the Consular Division of the Ministry of Foreign Affairs on the issue of immigration, personal status, and migration, with some of the Population Authority's powers abroad being delegated to the Minister of Foreign Affairs, who in turn, through secondary legislation, delegates some of his powers to Israeli missions abroad. By virtue of government decisions made on the subject, the Authority also cooperates with the Jewish Agency, the Ministry of Aliyah and Integration, which serves as the Population Authority's delegate in the naturalization process (upon initial arrival in Israel), and the Nativ (Liaison Bureau), which serves as the Authority's executive arm in the areas of immigration and status from the countries of the former Soviet Union.

== History ==
Prior to the establishment of the Population and Immigration Authority, the Director of the Population Administration was directly subordinate to the Director General of the Ministry of the Interior and was divided into a Registration and Status Division, which included the Registration and Passports Department, the Visas and Status Department (Visas and Foreigners Department), and the Citizenship Department, and a Bureau Division consisting of Population Administration bureaus scattered throughout the country, sub-bureaus, and registration stations. In addition, the directorate included the Border and Crossings Control Department, which operated in cooperation with the Border Control Department of the Israel Police and the Aliens Enforcement Unit. Since the establishment of the Population Authority, the Director of the Population Administration has been subordinate to the Director General of the Population Authority, and its departments have been elevated to the status of a "division". Population Authority employees derive their authority from various laws as well as from authorization regulations enacted by the Minister of the Interior (secondary legislation), in which he authorizes officials to exercise his powers.

On July 30, 2002, the 30th Prime Minister of Israel, Ariel Sharon, decided to establish an immigration department in the Israel Police, which would form the basis for the establishment of an immigration authority, with the aim of reducing the number of illegal residents, as well as the establishment of a support unit to handle foreign workers at the Ministry of Labor and Welfare. Gondar Rabbi (retired) Yaakov Ganot, former commander of the Border Guard (2001-2002) and commissioner of prisons (2003-2007), was entrusted with its establishment.

On April 4, 2004, the government decided on the establishment of the "Directorate of Population and Entry into Israel" in the Ministry of Interior, and determined that both the powers of the Israel Police in matters of border control and the authority unit for foreign workers in the Ministry of Foreign Affairs would be transferred to the responsibility of the Director of Population. It was originally stipulated that the transfer would be made by November 1, 2004, however this date was postponed to January 2006 and later to January 1, 2009.

On April 13, 2008, the Thirty-first government of Israel headed by Ehud Olmert decided to establish the "Population, Immigration and Border Crossings Authority", which will be created on the basis of and encompass the Population Administration and be responsible for the population sector and the treatment of foreign nationals. Among other things, it was decided to disband the Immigration Police (Hebrew: משטרת ההגירה) and transfer the authority to deal with illegal residents to the new authority. The task of establishment was entrusted to the head of the Population Administration (Hebrew: מנהל האוכלוסין) at the Ministry of the Interior, Ganot, who was appointed to his position in July 2007 by the Minister of the Interior Roni Bar-On. The Authority officially began its activities on July 15, 2008, incorporating, in a process that lasted about 3 years, the Population Administration that operated in the Ministry of the Interior, as well as units from the Ministry of Economy and Industry and the Israel Police.

Before the establishment of the Population and Immigration Authority, the head of Population Administration (Hebrew: מנהל אוכלוסין) was subordinated directly to the Director General of the Ministry of the Interior and it was divided into a Registration and Status Division which included the Registration and Passports Department (Hebrew: מחלקת מרשם ודרכונים), the Visas and Status Department (Hebrew: מחלקת מרשם ומעמד) (also known as Visas and Foreigners Department (Hebrew: מחלקת מרשם וזרים) and the Citizenship Department and the Chambers Division which was made up of territorial Population Administration Bureaus (Hebrew: לשכות מרשם אוכלוסין) located throughout the country, sub-offices and registration stations. In addition, the Population Administration included the border control and crossings department (Hebrew: המחלקה לביקורת גבולות ומעברים) which operated in cooperation with the border control department of the Israel Police and the enforcement unit for foreigners.

The new authority began its operation on July 1, 2009.

On August 19, 2018, the police arrested 83 suspects for questioning on suspicion of corruption among employees at the Population Authority branch in East Jerusalem. According to the suspicion, four Population Authority employees received bribes worth hundreds of thousands of shekels for providing service without waiting in line. In 2023, the authority began producing digital birth certificates. That same year, a "Passport Marathon" was held, in which Population Authority offices across the country were opened for overtime for about a month and the public was invited to renew passports without having to make an appointment, in order to overcome the long lines that had accumulated. The operation was considered successful after more than 425,000 passports were issued as part of it.

In September 2025, the Population and Immigration Authority began installing automatic machines with which applications for the issuance of identity cards and passports can be submitted at the authority's offices without the need for a human agent, in order to streamline the service and deal with the shortage of lines.

== Responsibilities ==
The Population and Immigration Authority coordinates the various aspects of dealing with foreign residents in Israel who are not Israeli citizens, including applicants for aliyah and citizenship, permanent residents, temporary residents, clergy with foreign citizenship, students, volunteers, tourists and those denied entry to Israel, Palestinian workers, illegal residents, foreign workers and refugees. The authority has a number of employees in charge of enforcing immigration laws on employers (a position previously filled by the Ministry of Industry, Trade and Employment), inspectors whose job it is to arrest illegal residents (which was previously the responsibility of the police) and employees of the Population Administration, who have the authority to order removal from the country. In addition, the authority operates an interrogation unit, whose role is to manage the processing of the applications of asylum seekers in Israel, including interviewing the asylum seekers, authority to issue residence permits and recommending who should be recognized as a refugee. Dealing with these issues requires the exercise of discretion, which forces the Authority to deal with many petitions attacking the discretion exercised.

The employees of the Population Authority draw their authority from various laws as well as from certification regulations established by the Minister of the Interior (subsidiary legislation), in which he authorizes officials to carry out his powers.

== Organization ==
- Population Administration (Hebrew: מנהל האוכלוסין) - responsible for all issues in the areas of the population registry and passports, citizenship and status, issuing and extending visas and more. The administration includes 54 bureaus scattered throughout the country. The former director formed the basis for the establishment of the Population Authority. The Population Administration includes the following departments:
  - Registration and Biometrics Department (Hebrew: אגף מרשם וביומטרי) - (also called Registration and Status Department (Hebrew: אגף מרשם ומעמד) and before that Immigration and Registration Department (Hebrew: מחלקת רישום ועליה) is a professional authority on the population registry laws, the Names Law and the Passport Law. The division is responsible for providing professional instructions on the issues of identity cards, travel documents, registering and correcting details in the population registry, dealing with issues of surrogacy abroad and registering a judicial parentage order.
  - Visa and Status Department (Hebrew: אגף אשרות ומעמד) - The department is the professional authority in the field of visas and status of new immigrants and foreigners in accordance with the provisions of the Law of Return and the Law of Entry to Israel. The Visas and Status Division is a professional authority on appeals and unusual and complex cases that are forwarded by the Offices of the Population Administration. In addition, the division is the professional authority regarding the graduated procedure for Israeli citizens who wish to live in Israel with their non-citizen spouses.)
  - Temporary Populations Department (Hebrew: אגף אוכלוסיות זמניות)- responsible for processing applications for entry visas (visas) and their extension for tourists, wage earners, volunteers, students, clergy, experts, etc. and also works with the Civil Administration regarding the entry of foreigners into the West Bank.
  - Citizenship Department (Hebrew: אגף אזרחות) - The division concentrates on the issue of handling the granting of Israeli citizenship by virtue of naturalization, granting and restoring citizenship as well as clarifying citizenship status and determining status, relinquishing and revocation of Israeli citizenship and providing documentation on the subject of citizenship including the citizenship of the Land of Israel. In addition, the division is a professional authority and responsible for writing procedures in the field of citizenship and providing answers to the Bureaus of the Population Administration and clarifying and making decisions in connection with requests submitted in Israeli consulates around the world regarding citizenship and status.
  - Bureau Operations Department (Hebrew: אגף תפעול לשכות) - The department is responsible for the Population Administration bureaus (Hebrew: לשכות מנהל אוכלוסין) (previously called Immigration and Registration Bureaus (Hebrew: לשכות רישום והגירה), sub-bureaus and registration stations that are scattered throughout the country in 6 regions: Jerusalem, Haifa, Tel Aviv, Central, Northern and South and which provide daily answers to registration and status issues.
- Foreign Workers Administration (Hebrew: מנהל עובדים זרים) - responsible for regulating the employment of foreign workers in accordance with government policy, in the following sectors: nursing, agriculture, construction and foreign experts and in national projects; as well as regulating the employment of Jordanian workers in the Eilat area and of Palestinian workers in industries authorized by the government and more. The administration deals with the implementation of bilateral agreements to bring in foreign workers from different countries, in granting permits for the employment of foreign workers and in issuing visas for foreign workers and in granting permits for the employment of Palestinian and Jordanian workers in accordance with the policies and employment quotas set by the government. Also, the department deals with granting licenses to manpower corporations and private bureaus in accordance with the law. The administration is also responsible for carrying out administrative enforcement in cases of violations of laws regulating the employment of Palestinian and Jordanian foreign workers.
- Enforcement and Foreigners Administration (Hebrew: מנהל אכיפה וזרים) - responsible for enforcing the laws relating to the stay of foreigners and the employment of foreigners. The directorate was established in July 2010 with the aim of uniting all the bodies involved in enforcement. The directorate works to reduce the number of illegal residents in Israel and at the same time also deals with safeguarding the rights of the foreign workers and their terms of employment. Also, the directorate is responsible for handling infiltrators and asylum seekers.
- Border Control Administration (Hebrew: מנהל ביקורת גבולות) - responsible for the operation of the border crossings and for carrying out border control at Israel's 22 international border crossings: six air crossings, eight sea crossings and nine land crossings. Border control is carried out through a front line, border controllers who conduct an initial questioning of foreign citizens and decide whether to grant an entry permit to the country and a back line where senior controllers and shift supervisors operate, whose duties are to conduct individual questioning if the controller in the front line was unable to determine the nature of the applicant to enter.

== Directors ==
- Ya'akov Ganot (2008-2009)
- Amnon Ben Ami (2010-2016)
- Amnon Shmueli (2016-2017, acting)
- Shlomo Mor-Yosef (2017-2021)
- Tomer Moskovits (2021-2023)
- Eyal Siso (2023-2025)
- Boaz Yosef (2025–present)

== Criticism and controversies ==
The Head of the Administration, Yaacov Ganot, was appointed in 2007. At the time, Knesset members and human rights groups expressed concern. Ganot had served as prisons commissioner and prior to that as head of the Immigration authority, where his employees were known for engaging in violent altercations with migrant workers.

In November 2013 two employees of the agency were arrested and charged with extorting female foreign workers. Police alleged that the employees may have demanded sexual favors in return for granting residence permit extensions.

In May 2014 Lod District Court Vice President Avraham Yaakov ordered a Swedish tourist of Eritrean origin be released from detention and that the Population, Immigration and Border Authority pay her damages of 25,000 shekels. The judge offered a scathing critique of PIBA and suggested that racism was at work in PIBA's detaining a black Swedish citizen. In the proceeding PIBA had offered to release the tourist if she agreed to leave a deposit of 30,000 NIS. The judge called this proposal "scandalous" and ordered her immediate release. The judge commented on the implications of PIBA poor decision-making: “Officials of the respondent acted arbitrarily and in an extremely unreasonable manner,” he said. “Israel cannot be perceived in the world as preventing the entry of European citizens based solely on their ethnicity.”

In September 2014, PIBA issued its new year updates, and included information on the most common new baby names in Israel. However, PIBA only included the top names for Jewish babies and failed to note that the actual top new baby name in Israel for the previous year was "Mohammed." A spokesperson for PIBA denied that the deletion of Muslim names was racist or discriminatory and that it had simply released the information that people wanted.
