= Elected Authorities (Northern Ireland) Act 1989 =

Act of the Parliament of the United Kingdom

Elected Authorities (Northern Ireland) Act 1989 (Note: Section 13(1).)
- Act of Parliament
- Parliament of the United Kingdom
- Long title: An Act to amend the law relating to the franchise at elections to district councils in Northern Ireland, to make provision in relation to a declaration against terrorism to be made by candidates at such elections and at elections to the Northern Ireland Assembly and by persons co-opted as members of district councils, to amend sections 3 and 4 of the Local Government Act (Northern Ireland) 1972, and for connected purposes.
- Citation: 1989 c. 3
- Territorial extent: Northern Ireland (Note: Section 13(7).)

Dates
- Royal assent: 15 March 1989
- Commencement: various (Note: Section 13(2).)
Other legislation
Amends	Interpretation Act (Northern Ireland) 1954; Electoral Law Act (Northern Ireland) 1962; Electoral Law Act (Northern Ireland) 1968; Electoral Law Act (Northern Ireland) 1969; Electoral Law Act (Northern Ireland) 1971; Local Government Act (Northern Ireland) 1972; Electoral Law (Northern Ireland) Order 1972; Northern Ireland Assembly Act 1973; Representation of the People Act 1985
Repeals/revokes	Electoral Law (Registration Rules) (Variation No.2) Order (Northern Ireland) 1980; Electoral Law (Registration Rules) (Variation) Order (Northern Ireland) 1985; Electoral Law (Registration Rules) (Variation) Order (Northern Ireland) 1986
Amended by	Representation of the People Act 2000; Terrorism Act 2000; Electoral Fraud (Northern Ireland) Act 2002; Electoral Administration Act 2006; Northern Ireland (Miscellaneous Provisions) Act 2006; Electoral Law Act (Northern Ireland) 1962 (Amendment) Order 2010; Northern Ireland (Miscellaneous Provisions) Act 2014; Anonymous Registration (Northern Ireland) Order 2014; Representation of the People (Electronic Communications and Amendment) (Northern Ireland) Regulations 2018; Elections Act 2022

Status: Amended

Text of statute as originally enacted

Revised text of statute as amended

Text of the Elected Authorities (Northern Ireland) Act 1989 as in force today (including any amendments) within the United Kingdom, from legislation.gov.uk.

The Elected Authorities (Northern Ireland) Act 1989 (c. 3) is an act of the Parliament of the United Kingdom. It brought in a law that required candidates standing for election in Northern Irish local and Northern Ireland Assembly elections to declare they would not, by word or deed, express support for or approval of proscribed organisations or acts of terrorism (that is to say, violence for political ends).

It disqualified numerous candidates in the 1989 Northern Ireland local government elections, particularly 23 candidates of the Republican Sinn Féin (RSF).

== Background ==
In Northern Ireland, elections to local government had historically been dominated by the unionist majority due to Catholic nationalist disincentive to take part in elections. In 1974, in order to encourage more Catholic participation the political wing of the Irish Republican Army, Sinn Féin; which had been designated as a proscribed terrorist organisation by the Parliament of Northern Ireland in 1956, was removed from the list of proscribed organisations. They then started to gain seats in local government.

In 1983, following the IRA Harrods bombing, the British government considered making Sinn Féin a proscribed organisation again alongside the Ulster Defence Association unionist paramilitary group. This proposal had support from the Democratic Unionist Party who claimed Sinn Féin were a front for terrorism and one newspaper called them "...the IRA in drag". A report by Sir George Baker argued against proscription of both groups however, he did make comments suggesting legislation against those using terrorism during elections.

== Provisions ==
Baker's report was used as grounds for the creation of the Elected Authorities (Northern Ireland) Act 1989. The act required that in order for any candidate to stand for election in Northern Ireland, they were required to make a declaration against terrorism. The full declaration is: "I declare that, if elected, I will not by word or deed express support for or approval of (a) any organisation that is for the time being a proscribed organisation specified in Schedule 2 of the Northern Ireland (Emergency Provisions) Act 1978: or (b) acts of terrorism (that is to say violence for political ends) connected with the affairs of Northern Ireland". The act also disqualified anyone who had been imprisoned for longer than three months from standing for elected office in Northern Ireland for five years.

== Results ==
Though the act was primarily aimed at Sinn Féin in lieu of outright proscription, Sinn Féin candidates agreed to sign the declaration. Republican Sinn Féin however called it a "test oath" and refused to sign it. As a result, their candidates were banned from taking part in the 1989 Northern Ireland local elections. They also attempted to run candidates in the 2011 Northern Ireland local elections but their nominations were rejected because they again refused to sign the declaration as required by the act.
