= Elections Act 2001 =

Act of the Parliament of the United Kingdom

Elections Act 2001 (Note: Section 8.)
- Act of Parliament
- Parliament of the United Kingdom
- Long title: An Act to postpone local elections in England and Wales and Northern Ireland, to require polls for different elections in Northern Ireland to be taken together if they are to be taken on the same day, and to make consequential provision.
- Citation: 2001 c. 7
- Territorial extent: United Kingdom

Dates
- Royal assent: 10 April 2001
- Commencement: 10 April 2001 (Note: Section 4(b) of the Interpretation Act 1978.)
Other legislation
Amends	Electoral Law Act (Northern Ireland) 1962; Representation of the People Act 1983; Representation of the People Act 1985; Local Elections (Northern Ireland) Order 1985; Parliamentary Elections (Returning Officer’s Charges) (Northern Ireland) Order 1997; Northern Ireland Act 1998; Representation of the People (Northern Ireland) Regulations 2001
Amended by	Local Elections (Northern Ireland) Order 2010; Fixed-term Parliaments Act 2011; Anonymous Registration (Northern Ireland) Order 2014; Elections Act 2022; Local Elections (Northern Ireland) (Amendment) Order 2024

Status: Amended

Text of statute as originally enacted

Text of the Elections Act 2001 as in force today (including any amendments) within the United Kingdom, from legislation.gov.uk.

The Elections Act 2001 (c. 7) is an act of the Parliament of the United Kingdom. Because of the 2001 United Kingdom foot-and-mouth crisis the act postponed the 2001 local government elections in England and Wales, from 3 May 2001 to 7 June 2001, and in Northern Ireland, from 16 May 2001 to 7 June 2001. In Northern Ireland, it also required polls to be taken together on the day. In England, Wales and Northern Ireland it also increased candidates expenses by 50%.

It also defines the rules for taking both the parliamentary and local elections at the same time in Northern Ireland, amending Representation of the People Act 1985.

== Reception ==
The Conservative Party criticised the legislation, describing it as an "insult to the parliamentary process".
