= Electoral Administration Act 2006 =

Act of the Parliament of the United Kingdom

Electoral Administration Act 2006 (Note: Section 79.)
- Act of Parliament
- Parliament of the United Kingdom
- Long title: An Act to make provision in relation to the registration of electors and the keeping of electoral registration information; standing for election; the administration and conduct of elections and referendums; and the regulation of political parties.
- Citation: 2006 c. 22
- Introduced by: Harriet Harman
- Territorial extent: England and Wales; Scotland (in part); Northern Ireland; (Note: Section 78.)

Dates
- Royal assent: 11 July 2006
- Commencement: Various (Note: Section 77.)
Other legislation
Amends	Parliamentary Elections Act 1695; Act of Settlement 1701; Parliamentary Elections (Ireland) Act 1823; Electoral Law Act (Northern Ireland) 1962; Family Law Reform Act 1969; Local Government (Scotland) Act 1973; Juries Act 1974; British Nationality Act 1981; Representation of the People Act 1983; Police and Criminal Evidence Act 1984; Representation of the People Act 1985; Elected Authorities (Northern Ireland) Act 1989; Representation of the People Act 2000; Political Parties, Elections and Referendums Act 2000; Electoral Fraud (Northern Ireland) Act 2002; Civil Partnership Act 2004
Repeals/revokes	Election Act 1707
Amended by	Northern Ireland (Miscellaneous Provisions) Act 2006; Local Electoral Administration and Registration Services (Scotland) Act 2006 (Consequential Provisions and Modifications) Order 2007; Political Parties and Elections Act 2009; Police and Crime Commissioner Elections Order 2012; Electoral Registration and Administration Act 2013; Northern Ireland (Miscellaneous Provisions) Act 2014; Anonymous Registration (Northern Ireland) Order 2014; Recall of MPs Act 2015; Interests of Members of the Scottish Parliament (Amendment) Act 2016; European Parliamentary Elections Etc. (Repeal, Revocation, Amendment and Saving Provisions) (United Kingdom and Gibraltar) (EU Exit) Regulations 2018; Scottish Elections (Reform) Act 2020; Transfer of Functions (Secretary of State for Levelling Up, Housing and Communities) Order 2021; Elections Act 2022; Elections and Elected Bodies (Wales) Act 2024; Senedd Cymru (Members and Elections) Act 2024; Political Parties, Elections and Referendums Act 2000 (Exclusions and Variation of Campaign Expenditure Limits) (Wales) Regulations 2025

Status: Amended

History of passage through Parliament

Text of statute as originally enacted

Revised text of statute as amended

The Electoral Administration Act 2006 (c. 22) is an act of the Parliament of the United Kingdom, passed on 11 July 2006.

Among its main provisions, the act:

- Provides a legislative framework for setting up a "Coordinated Online Record of Electors", known as "CORE", to co-ordinate electoral registration information across regions.
- Creates new criminal offences for supplying false electoral registration details or for failure to supply such details.
- Allows people to register anonymously on electoral registers if a 'safety test' is passed.
- Requires local authorities to review all polling stations, and to provide a report on the reviews to the Electoral Commission.
- Provides for the making of signature and date of birth checks on postal vote applications.
- Revises the law on "undue influence".
- Allows observers to monitor elections (with the exception of Scottish local government elections, which are the responsibility of the Scottish Parliament).
- Reduces the age of candidacy for public elections from 21 to 18.
- Allows for alterations to ballot paper designs, including the introduction of barcodes and pilot schemes for the introduction of photographs on ballot papers.
- Allows citizens of the Republic of Ireland and certain Commonwealth residents the right to stand in elections.
- Changes rules on how elections are run in the event of the death of a candidate, following the events in South Staffordshire at the 2005 general election.
- Provides for the entitlement of children to accompany parents and carers into polling stations.
- Bars candidates from using in their name or description expressions such as "Don't vote for them" or "None of the above".
- Bars candidates from standing in more than one constituency at the same election.
- Allows political parties up to 12 separate descriptions to be used on ballot papers, and allows joint candidature.
- Requires local authorities to promote and encourage electoral registration and voting.
- Amongst other provisions affecting members of the armed forces and other persons with a "service qualification", allows the Secretary of State to extend the period of validity (previously one year) of a "service declaration" by which qualified persons may have their names placed on the electoral register as "service voters"; the Act also imposes new duties upon the Ministry of Defence.
- Removes the requirement for an observer to witness the signing of the security statement of a postal vote.
- Requires political parties to declare large loans. This provision was introduced as an amendment, surviving much parliamentary ping-pong, following the "Cash for Peerages" scandal.

Some of its provisions came into effect upon it receiving assent, with other provisions commencing on other dates.

== Coordinated Online Record of Electors ==
The proposed Coordinated Online Record of Electors was never established, and plans for it were shelved by the coalition government in 2011. The legal framework was later repealed by the Electoral Registration and Administration Act 2013.
