= Voter Authority Certificate =

UK voter identification

The Voter Authority Certificate (VAC) is a type of voter identification that can be obtained by an eligible United Kingdom voter in lieu of other photo identification (for example, a passport, a full or provisional driving licence, or other eligible document) that a voter may not have. The VAC Web site states that "Your Voter Authority Certificate cannot be used as proof of identification for other reasons, for example to prove your age."

This service was established with the Elections Act 2022, which requires voter ID in English local, PCC, and UK-wide elections for the first time. The lack of a national ID card in the UK and non-universal adoption of other forms of ID necessitated this service. Proof of identity with photograph is only required for voting in person. As the Act only covers English local, PCC, and UK-wide elections, voters in Scottish Parliament, Scottish local, Senedd/Welsh Parliament, and Welsh local elections are not required to present a voter ID.

Ahead of the May 2023 local elections, it was reported that only 10,000 people had applied for the certificate, which was just 0.5% of the 2 million people identified as likely lacking any acceptable photo ID. After the elections, research carried out by the Electoral Commission found that only 57% of people were aware that the certificate was available, and only 25,000 were used on polling day.

Shortly before the 2024 general election, it was reported that since their introduction in January 2023, 214,051 applications had been made for the certificate, with 57,418 of those made after the general election was called.
