= List of acts of Senedd Cymru from 2024 =

This is a list of acts of Senedd Cymru passed in 2024. Acts of Senedd Cymru are enacted by Senedd Cymru (the Welsh Parliament; or simply the Senedd), which has legislative authority over devolved matters in relation to Wales under the authority of the Government of Wales Act 2006. All legislation passed by the Senedd is bilingual, with the English and Welsh texts being equally authoritative. Acts are cited by calendar year, in the same fashion as acts of Parliament of the United Kingdom. Each act passed in a respective year is numbered consecutively with Arabic numerals, following the prefix "asc" (or, in Welsh, "dsc").

6 acts of Senedd Cymru were passed in 2024.

indicates that an act has been transcribed on Wikisource, indicates that an act is available to view at legislation.gov.uk, and indicates the location of the original act in the National Library of Wales.

== Acts of Senedd Cymru ==
Short title	Citation	Royal assent
Long title
Health Service Procurement (Wales) Act 2024; Deddf Caffael y Gwasanaeth Iechyd (Cymru) 2024	2024 asc 1; 2024 dsc 1	5 February 2024
An Act of Senedd Cymru in relation to the procurement of health services in Wales. Deddf gan Senedd Cymru mewn perthynas â chaffael gwasanaethau iechyd yng Nghymru.
Environment (Air Quality and Soundscapes) (Wales) Act 2024; Ddeddf yr Amgylchedd (Ansawdd Aer a Seinweddau) (Cymru) 2024	2024 asc 2; 2024 dsc 2	14 February 2024
An Act of Senedd Cymru to make provision for improving air quality in Wales; for a national strategy for assessing and managing soundscapes in Wales; and for connected purposes. Deddf gan Senedd Cymru i wneud darpariaeth ar gyfer gwella ansawdd aer yng Nghymru; ar gyfer strategaeth genedlaethol i asesu a rheoli seinweddau yng Nghymru; ac at ddibenion cysylltiedig.
Infrastructure (Wales) Act 2024; Deddf Seilwaith (Cymru) 2024	2024 asc 3; 2024 dsc 3	3 June 2024
An Act of Senedd Cymru to reform the law governing the development of significant infrastructure in Wales and the Welsh marine area; and for connected purposes. Deddf gan Senedd Cymru i ddiwygio’r gyfraith sy’n llywodraethu datblygiad seilwaith arwyddocaol yng Nghymru ac ardal forol Cymru; ac at ddibenion cysylltiedig.
Senedd Cymru (Members and Elections) Act 2024 or the Senedd Reform Act; Deddf Senedd Cymru (Aelodau ac Etholiadau) 2024	2024 asc 4; 2024 dsc 4	3 June 2024
An Act of Senedd Cymru to make provision about Members of the Senedd and offices held by those Members; Senedd Cymru constituencies; returning and maintaining Senedd Cymru; the Local Democracy and Boundary Commission for Wales; and for connected purposes. Deddf gan Senedd Cymru i wneud darpariaeth ynghylch‍ Aelodau o’r Senedd a swyddi a ddelir gan yr Aelodau hynny; etholaethau Senedd Cymru; dychwelyd Senedd Cymru a’i chynnal; Comisiwn Ffiniau a Democratiaeth Leol Cymru; ac at ddibenion cysylltiedig.
Elections and Elected Bodies (Wales) Act 2024; Deddf Etholiadau a Chyrff Etholedig (Cymru) 2024	2024 asc 5; 2024 dsc 5	9 September 2024
An Act of Senedd Cymru to make provision about electoral administration and registration in Wales; piloting of changes to the electoral system in Wales; the system for reviewing arrangements for local government in Wales; disqualifying community councillors from membership of Senedd Cymru; the corrupt practice of undue influence as it applies to Senedd Cymru elections and local government elections in Wales; and the functions and constitution of the Democracy and Boundary Commission Cymru. Deddf gan Senedd Cymru i wneud darpariaeth ynghylch gweinyddu a chofrestru etholiadol yng Nghymru; peilota newidiadau i’r system etholiadol yng Nghymru; y system i adolygu trefniadau ar gyfer llywodraeth leol yng Nghymru; anghymhwyso cynghorwyr cymuned rhag bod yn aelodau o Senedd Cymru; yr arfer llwgr o ddylanwad amhriodol fel y mae’n gymwys i etholiadau Senedd Cymru ac etholiadau llywodraeth leol yng Nghymru; a swyddogaethau a chyfansoddiad Comisiwn Democratiaeth a Ffiniau Cymru.
Local Government Finance (Wales) Act 2024; Deddf Cyllid Llywodraeth Leol (Cymru) 2024	2024 asc 6; 2024 dsc 6	16 September 2024
An Act of Senedd Cymru to make provision about non-domestic rating and council tax. Deddf gan Senedd Cymru i wneud darpariaeth ynghylch ardrethu annomestig a’r dreth gyngor.
