= Representation of the People Act 1983 =

Act of the Parliament of the United Kingdom

Representation of the People Act 1983 (Note: Section 207.)
- Act of Parliament
- Parliament of the United Kingdom
- Long title: An Act to consolidate the Representation of the People Acts of 1949, 1969, 1977, 1978 and 1980, the Electoral Registers Acts of 1949 and 1953, the Elections (Welsh Forms) Act 1964, Part III of the Local Government Act 1972, sections 6 to 10 of the Local Government (Scotland) Act 1973, the Representation of the People (Armed Forces) Act 1976, the Returning Officers (Scotland) Act 1977, section 3 of the Representation of the People Act 1981, section 62 of and Schedule 2 to the Mental Health (Amendment) Act 1982, and connected provisions; and to repeal as obsolete the Representation of the People Act 1979 and other enactments related to the Representation of the People Acts.
- Citation: 1983 c. 2
- Territorial extent: United Kingdom

Dates
- Royal assent: 8 February 1983
- Commencement: 15 March 1983 (Note: The Representation of the People Act 1983 (Commencement) Order 1983 (SI 1983/153).)
Other legislation
Amends	Senior Courts Act 1981; See § Repealed enactments
Repeals/revokes	See § Repealed enactments
Amended by	Representation of the People Act 1985; Statute Law (Repeals) Act 1986; Representation of the People Act 1989; Statute Law (Repeals) Act 1989; Law Reform (Miscellaneous Provisions) (Scotland) Act 1990; Statute Law (Repeals) Act 1993; Registration of Political Parties Act 1998; Representation of the People Act 2000; Postal Services Act 2000; Political Parties, Elections and Referendums Act 2000; House of Commons (Removal of Clergy Disqualification) Act 2001; Elections Act 2001; Electoral Fraud (Northern Ireland) Act 2002; European Parliamentary Elections Act 2002; Domestic Violence, Crime and Victims Act 2004; Electoral Administration Act 2006; Local Electoral Administration and Registration Services (Scotland) Act 2006; Northern Ireland (Miscellaneous Provisions) Act 2006; Political Parties and Elections Act 2009; Constitutional Reform and Governance Act 2010; Parliamentary Voting System and Constituencies Act 2011; Postal Services Act 2011; Electoral Registration and Administration Act 2013; Northern Ireland (Miscellaneous Provisions) Act 2014; Recall of MPs Act 2015; Scotland Act 2016; Policing and Crime Act 2017; Wales Act 2017; Scottish Elections (Reform) Act 2020; Senedd and Elections (Wales) Act 2020; Dissolution and Calling of Parliament Act 2022; Elections Act 2022; Ballot Secrecy Act 2023; National Security Act 2023; Elections and Elected Bodies (Wales) Act 2024; Absent Voting (Elections in Scotland and Wales) Act 2025; English Devolution and Community Empowerment Act 2026

Status: Amended

Text of statute as originally enacted

Text of the Representation of the People Act 1983 as in force today (including any amendments) within the United Kingdom, from legislation.gov.uk.

The Representation of the People Act 1983 (c. 2) is an act of the Parliament of the United Kingdom. It changed the British electoral process in the following ways:

- Amended the Representation of the People Act 1969 (c. 15).
- Stated that a convicted person cannot vote at any parliamentary or local election whilst in prison.
- Laid down the appeals process in local elections

The act also regulates how political parties and people acting on their behalf are to behave before and during an election.

== Provisions ==
=== Prisoner voting ===
Section 3 prohibits prevents individuals detained in prison and mental health hospitals from being able to vote in UK Parliament elections and local elections in England and Wales.

=== Election expenses ===
Sections 72 to 90 control the total election expenses that can be spent on behalf of a candidate.

During the time limit of the election, all money spent on the promotion of a candidate must be authorised by his election agent. This includes the cost of holding public meetings, organising public displays, issuing advertisements, circulars, or otherwise presenting the candidate's views and the extent or nature of his backing or disparaging another candidate. It does not include travel expenses from home or similar personal expenses.

The expenses limit for the campaign (which is enforceable due to it all having to be authorised by one person) is £100,000 for a parliamentary by-election, but is approximately £5,483 plus either 6.2p or 4.6p for every registered voter in the district.

=== Publicity at parliamentary elections ===
Section 91 entitles candidates to one free mailshot of election material to all voters in the constituency. Section 94 makes it illegal to print fake polling cards.

=== Election meetings ===
Sections 95 to 98 entitle the candidate to hold public meetings free of charge in schools and other public buildings in the constituency, and pay only the cost price for making the rooms available.

=== Agency by election officials and canvassing by police officers ===
Sections 99 makes it illegal for officers in charge of administering an election to be involved in any of the election campaigns.

Section 100 forbids a police officer from canvassing in any election which overlaps with their police area.

=== Conveyance of voters to and from the poll ===
Sections 101 to 105 made it illegal to hire or lend taxis and buses to give lifts of voters to the ballot box. These sections were repealed by Political Parties, Elections and Referendums Act 2000 (c. 41).

=== Other illegal practices, payments, employments or hirings ===
==== False statements as to candidates ====
Section 106 makes it illegal for any person to publish any false statement of fact in relation to the candidate's personal character or conduct, unless he or she can show that he had reasonable grounds for believing that statement to be true. Similar provisions in previous laws have made this illegal since 1895. It is also illegal to publish a false statement of a candidate's withdrawal from an election.

In September 2007 Miranda Grell was found guilty under this section when she made allegations of paedophilia and having sex with teenage boys against her gay opponent during the 2006 United Kingdom local elections.

In November 2010, Labour MP Phil Woolas was found by an electoral court to have breached section 106. The judges ruled that a by-election for the seat should be held. Woolas said that he would apply for a judicial review into the ruling. In a statement released through his lawyer, Woolas stated that "this election petition raised fundamental issues about the freedom to question and criticise politicians" and that it "will inevitably chill political speech". The judicial review failed to overturn the ruling of the election court.

In June 2015 the independent candidate in Mid Bedfordshire, Tim Ireland, lodged an appeal against the result at the general election, accusing Nadine Dorries of breaches of section 106 by making false statements about his character. The petition was rejected by the High Court of Justice because it was served at Dorries' constituency office and not her home address.

==== Corrupt withdrawal from candidature ====
Section 107 makes it illegal to bribe a candidate to withdraw from an election.

==== Premises not to be used as committee rooms ====
Section 108 made it illegal to hire a room in a pub for holding a campaign committee meeting. This section was repealed by the Political Parties, Elections and Referendums Act 2000.

==== Payments for exhibition of election notices ====
Section 109 prohibits hiring special advertising spaces (e.g. on the sides of houses) for the display of campaign posters (hiring ordinary advertising billboards used for regular advertising is permitted).

==== Details to appear on election publications ====
Section 110 states that any material, leaflet or advertisement for a candidate in an election must include the names and addresses of the printer, the promoter, and the person on behalf of whom the material is being published.

In December 2008 a Liverpool City Liberal Democrats councillor was found guilty under this section for delivering leaflets during the 2007 United Kingdom local elections purporting to be on behalf of The United Socialist Party (but lacking the necessary names and addresses) attacking the Labour candidate for crossing a picket line during a strike, and accusing his wife (who is a sitting councillor) of leaving council meetings early to learn lap dancing.

=== Parliamentary election rules ===
Schedule 1 of the act lays out in complete form the rules for running a parliamentary election and how the nomination papers should be handled. A deposit must be lodged before a candidate can stand for election.

=== Short title, commencement and extent ===
Section 207(2) of the act provided that act would come into force on a day appointed by the home secretary by statutory instrument.

== See also ==
- Corrupt practices
- Reform Acts
- Representation of the People Act
- Hirst v United Kingdom (No 2)
