= Electoral Fraud (Northern Ireland) Act 2002 =

Act of the Parliament of the United Kingdom

Electoral Fraud (Northern Ireland) Act 2002 (Note: Section 8(1).)
- Act of Parliament
- Parliament of the United Kingdom
- Long title: An Act to provide for the supply to the Chief Electoral Officer for Northern Ireland of the signatures, dates of birth and national insurance numbers of electors and persons seeking registration as electors in Northern Ireland and of information relating to their period of residence in Northern Ireland and addresses in respect of which they are or have applied to be registered; for the use of that information in connection with elections in Northern Ireland; for the issue of electoral identity cards by the Chief Electoral Officer for Northern Ireland; for the modification in relation to voters with disabilities of certain rules about voting procedure in Northern Ireland; and for connected purposes.
- Citation: 2002 c. 13
- Territorial extent: Northern Ireland (Note: Section 8(5).)

Dates
- Royal assent: 1 May 2002
- Commencement: 1 September 2002 (Note: Section 8(3). The Electoral Fraud (Northern Ireland) Act 2002 (Commencement) Order 2002.)
Other legislation
| Amends | Representation of the People Act 1983; Representation of the People Act 1985; Elected Authorities (Northern Ireland) Act 1989; Northern Ireland Act 1998; Northern Ireland Assembly (Elections) Order 2001 |
| Amended by | Electoral Administration Act 2006; Political Parties and Elections Act 2009; Northern Ireland (Miscellaneous Provisions) Act 2014; Elections Act 2022 |
| Relates to | Representation of the People Act 1983 |

Status: Amended

Text of statute as originally enacted

Revised text of statute as amended

The Electoral Fraud (Northern Ireland) Act 2002 (c. 13) is an act of the Parliament of the United Kingdom which reformed the electoral system in Northern Ireland. The act amended the Representation of the People Act 1983 by strengthening the requirements in the electoral registration process and requiring photographic identification at polling stations.

The Chief Electoral Officer for Northern Ireland is the returning officer and electoral registration officer for all of Northern Ireland, and runs the Electoral Office for Northern Ireland, which compiles the electoral roll and manages all elections in Northern Ireland. In the rest of the United Kingdom, these functions are delegated by local authorities.

Under existing legalisation, the "head of household" was required to register all residents who were eligible to vote. The act changed the registration procedure, introducing Individual Electoral Registration, and requiring eligible voters to provide the Electoral Office for Northern Ireland with their signature, date of birth, National Insurance number and current residence. The act also required voters to present a photographic identity card at a polling station before casting a vote, with the Northern Ireland Electoral Identity Card created for voters without an acceptable form of ID.

Introduced to counter lack of public confidence in the electoral process in Northern Ireland, the Act was found to have improved public perceptions, and returning officers also reported a marked reduction in suspected incidences of voting fraud. In August 2002 the last register of electors compiled under the old system contained nearly 1.2 million names, while the first register under the new system, published in December 2002, contained fewer than 1.1 million names, losing some 120,000 names for a net reduction of 10%.
