= Northern Ireland (Miscellaneous Provisions) Act 2006 =

Act of the Parliament of the United Kingdom

Northern Ireland (Miscellaneous Provisions) Act 2006 (Note: Section 33.)
- Act of Parliament
- Parliament of the United Kingdom
- Long title: An Act to make provision about registration of electors and the Chief Electoral Officer for Northern Ireland; to amend the Northern Ireland Act 1998; to make provision about donations for political purposes; to extend the amnesty period for arms decommissioning in Northern Ireland; and to make miscellaneous amendments in the law relating to Northern Ireland.
- Citation: 2006 c. 33
- Territorial extent: United Kingdom (Note: Section 32.)

Dates
- Royal assent: 25 July 2006
- Commencement: Various (Note: Section 31.)
Other legislation
Amends	Electoral Law Act (Northern Ireland) 1962; Northern Ireland (Loans) Act 1975; Judicature (Northern Ireland) Act 1978; Health and Safety at Work (Northern Ireland) Order 1978; Representation of the People Act 1983; Elected Authorities (Northern Ireland) Act 1989; Northern Ireland (Loans) (Increase of Limit) Order 1995; Employment Rights (Northern Ireland) Order 1996; Northern Ireland Arms Decommissioning Act 1997; Northern Ireland Act 1998; Political Parties, Elections and Referendums Act 2000; Justice (Northern Ireland) Act 2002; Energy (Northern Ireland) Order 2003; Inquiries Act 2005; Serious Organised Crime and Police Act 2005; Electoral Administration Act 2006
Repeals/revokes	Northern Ireland (Loans) Act 1985
Amended by	Northern Ireland (St Andrews Agreement) Act 2006; Justice and Security (Northern Ireland) Act 2007; Electoral Administration Act 2006 (Regulation of Loans etc: Northern Ireland) Order 2008; Northern Ireland Act 2009; Northern Ireland Act 1998 (Devolution of Policing and Justice Functions) Order 2010; Electoral Registration and Administration Act 2013; Northern Ireland (Miscellaneous Provisions) Act 2014; Departments (Transfer of Functions) Order (Northern Ireland) 2016; European Parliamentary Elections Etc. (Repeal, Revocation, Amendment and Saving Provisions) (United Kingdom and Gibraltar) (EU Exit) Regulations 2018

Status: Amended

History of passage through Parliament

Text of statute as originally enacted

Revised text of statute as amended

The Northern Ireland (Miscellaneous Provisions) Act 2006 (c. 33) is an act of the Parliament of the United Kingdom.

== Provisions ==
The act set out new provisions in relation to the registration of electors and the conduct of elections in Northern Ireland including removing the requirement for an annual canvass. It also restricted political donations.

The act increased the borrowing power of the executive.

The act extended the period for arms decommissioning by former paramilitary organisations in Northern Ireland.

It and made a few other changes in the law relating to Northern Ireland including energy reform.

== Section 31 – Commencement ==
The following orders were made under this section:

- The Northern Ireland (Miscellaneous Provisions) Act 2006 (Commencement No. 1) Order 2006 (SI 2006/2688 (C.91))
- The Northern Ireland (Miscellaneous Provisions) Act 2006 (Commencement No. 2) Order 2006 (SI 2006/2966 (C.104))
- The Northern Ireland (Miscellaneous Provisions) Act 2006 (Commencement No. 3) Order 2006 (SI 2006/3263 (C.118))
- The Northern Ireland (Miscellaneous Provisions) Act 2006 (Commencement No. 4) Order 2008 (SI 2008/1318 (C.56))
- The Northern Ireland (Miscellaneous Provisions) Act 2006 (Commencement No. 5) Order 2009 (SI 2009/448 (C.30))

== See also ==
- Northern Ireland Act
