= Northern Ireland (Miscellaneous Provisions) Act 2014 =

Act of the Parliament of the United Kingdom

Northern Ireland (Miscellaneous Provisions) Act 2014 (Note: Section 29.)
- Act of Parliament
- Parliament of the United Kingdom
- Long title: An Act to make provision about donations, loans and related transactions for political purposes in connection with Northern Ireland; to amend the Northern Ireland Assembly Disqualification Act 1975 and the Northern Ireland Act 1998; to make provision about the registration of electors and the administration of elections in Northern Ireland; and to make miscellaneous amendments in the law relating to Northern Ireland.
- Citation: 2014 c. 13
- Introduced by: Theresa Villiers MP, Secretary of State for Northern Ireland (Commons); Baroness Randerson (Lords)
- Territorial extent: United Kingdom (Note: Section 27.)

Dates
- Royal assent: 13 March 2014
- Commencement: Various (Note: Section 28.)
Other legislation
Amends	Coroners Act (Northern Ireland) 1959; Northern Ireland Assembly Disqualification Act 1975; Judicature (Northern Ireland) Act 1978; County Courts (Northern Ireland) Order 1980; Magistrates' Courts (Northern Ireland) Order 1981; Representation of the People Act 1983; Elected Authorities (Northern Ireland) Act 1989; Northern Ireland Act 1998; Representation of the People Act 2000; Political Parties, Elections and Referendums Act 2000; European Parliamentary Elections (Franchise of Relevant Citizens of the Union) Regulations 2001; Northern Ireland Assembly (Elections) Order 2001; Electoral Fraud (Northern Ireland) Act 2002; Electoral Administration Act 2006; Northern Ireland (Miscellaneous Provisions) Act 2006; Electoral Administration Act 2006 (Regulation of Loans etc: Northern Ireland) Order 2008Representation of the People (Northern Ireland) Regulations 2008; Protection of Freedoms Act 2012
Amended by	Elections Act 2022
Relates to	Statutory Instruments Act 1946

Status: Amended

Text of statute as originally enacted

Revised text of statute as amended

The Northern Ireland (Miscellaneous Provisions) Act 2014 (c. 13) is an act of the Parliament of the United Kingdom. It was passed with the intent to ban dual mandates (also known as double-jobbing) for Members of the Legislative Assembly (MLAs) and to bring the Northern Ireland Assembly's elections into line with the other British devolved legislatures. It received royal assent on 13 March 2014.

== Elections ==
During the debate on the Fixed-term Parliaments Act 2011, the Scottish Parliament and the Welsh Assembly passed motions requesting the Government of the United Kingdom to delay their respective devolved legislature elections in 2015 to avoid a clash with the 2015 general election. The UK Government passed an amendment to the bill to allow for their elections to take place in 2016. Northern Ireland was not included in this bill due to the 2011 Northern Ireland Assembly election taking place at the time. The Northern Ireland (Miscellaneous Provisions) Act was passed to bring the Northern Ireland Assembly into line with the other devolved legislatures and to extend each Assembly term to five years instead of four.

The Act also provided the option for the Assembly to reduce its size to 90 MLAs. The option for an official opposition to be formed in the Assembly if there was sufficient cross community support was considered during the parliamentary debate, but was not included in the final act.

== "Double-jobbing" ==
In 2009, a House of Commons report recommended banning double-jobbing despite noting that it was a part of political culture in Northern Ireland as part of a legacy of The Troubles which had discouraged people from taking part in standing for elected office. Indeed, at one point both Ian Paisley and John Hume were "triple-jobbing" as an MLA, MP and MEP. By 2011 all the major parties in Northern Ireland had agreed to the principle of ending double-jobbing. The legislation prohibited people from being a member of the House of Commons or the Republic of Ireland's Dáil Éireann as well as an MLA. The legislation banned double-jobbing from the 2016 Northern Ireland Assembly election but allowed those who currently held dual mandates to hold them until the election when they would have eight days to decide which legislature they wished to sit in. Three members had this possibility at the time of passage, but following the 2015 UK general election, the last person in Northern Ireland with a dual mandate was Gregory Campbell as an MLA and MP for East Londonderry.
