= Representation of the People Act 2000 =

Act of the Parliament of the United Kingdom

Representation of the People Act 2000 (Note: Section 17(1).)
- Act of Parliament
- Parliament of the United Kingdom
- Long title: An Act to make new provision with respect to the registration of voters for the purposes of parliamentary and local government elections; to make other provision in relation to voting at such elections; and for connected purposes.
- Citation: 2000 c. 2
- Introduced by: Jack Straw, Secretary of State for the Home Department (Commons)
- Territorial extent: United Kingdom (Note: Section 17(6)–(9).)

Dates
- Royal assent: 9 March 2000
- Commencement: Various (Note: Section 17(3). The Representation of the People Act 2000 (Commencement) Order 2001 (SI 2001/116).)
Other legislation
Amends	Representation of the People Act 1983; Representation of the People Act 1985; Elected Authorities (Northern Ireland) Act 1989; Representation of the People Act 1989
Repeals/revokes	Representation of the People Act 1990
Amended by	Political Parties, Elections and Referendums Act 2000; European Parliamentary Elections Act 2002; Civil Partnership Act 2004; Electoral Administration Act 2006; Local Electoral Administration and Registration Services (Scotland) Act 2006; Electoral Registration and Administration Act 2013; Northern Ireland (Miscellaneous Provisions) Act 2014; Scottish Elections (Reduction of Voting Age) Act 2015; Policing and Crime Act 2017; Scottish Elections (Franchise and Representation) Act 2020; Local Government and Elections (Wales) Act 2021; Elections Act 2022; Elections and Elected Bodies (Wales) Act 2024; Absent Voting (Elections in Scotland and Wales) Act 2025

Status: Amended

Text of statute as originally enacted

Revised text of statute as amended

The Representation of the People Act 2000 (c. 2) is an act of the Parliament of the United Kingdom concerning electoral procedure.

== Provisions ==
The act changed the British electoral process in four minor amendments to the Representation of the People Act 1983:

- It removed most restrictions on postal voting and proxy voting.
- It allows psychiatric hospitals to be used as a registration address.
- It requires additional assistance for disabled voters, particularly visually impaired voters.
- It made provision for new regulations governing the access, sale and supply of electoral registers.

The act also enabled the piloting of electronic voting and electronic counting of ballots.

The act enabled "mailshots" to be sent to every registered voter in the form of a free booklet containing election addresses from all the candidates in the London mayoral elections.

== See also ==
- Reform Acts
- Representation of the People Act
