= Toby James =

British political scientist

Toby Samuel James (born 1979), is a professor of political science and public policy at the University of East Anglia in the United Kingdom. James is known for his work on the fairness and integrity of elections, but also on political leadership and the policy process. He is the editor-in-chief of the journal Policy Studies.

== Early life and education ==
James was awarded a Ph.D. from the University of York, and worked at the Library of Congress, University of Swansea, and University of Sydney, before joining the University of East Anglia.

== Career ==
=== Published works ===
James wrote his first book, Elite Statecraft and Election Administration, on the politics of how elections are run. Writing about the history of reform in the UK, Ireland and the US, he argued that politicians often try to reform how elections are run to maximise political interest, but this would depend on whether nature of the political system.

James' second main work focused on electoral management – how elections are organised and delivered. In Comparative Electoral Management electoral management was defined as the study of: 'the organisations, networks, resources, micro anthropological working practices and instruments involved in implementing elections'. The book then provided a method for assessing the delivery of elections, a new method for identifying who was responsible for running elections and the ways in which running elections could be improved.

=== Research areas ===
James has commonly drawn from and re-developed statecraft theory. He published books with former Labour minister Charles Clarke about former UK party leaders using the approach. His work involved interviewing leaders such as Tony Blair, Nick Clegg and William Hague to assess the theory, which were serialised in British newspapers before the analysis was published in an academic journal.

=== Policy work ===
Toby James has been proactive in using research to influence policy to try to improve the integrity of elections. He was the founding adviser to the UK All Party Parliamentary Group on Democratic Participation, which he worked to establish with Bite the Ballot. James was co-author of the Missing Millions report in 2016 on voter registration which was influential in shaping government policy and debate about voter registration. The Minister of State at the time, Chris Skidmore, said that the report would 'go down in history as helping to evolve the UK's electoral registration system.' A second edition of the report was published in 2019 making the case for further voter registration reform.

He was a prominent critic of the UK government's plans to introduce voter identification requirements in Britain.

At the international level he was the co-founding co-convenor of the Electoral Management Network in 2016 which has brought together practitioners and academics from around the world in several high-profile conferences. He later became co-director of the Electoral Integrity Project in 2021.
