= Political Parties and Elections Act 2009 =

Act of the Parliament of the United Kingdom

Political Parties and Elections Act 2009 (Note: Section 44.)
- Act of Parliament
- Parliament of the United Kingdom
- Long title: An Act to make provision in connection with the Electoral Commission; to make provision about political donations, loans and related transactions and about political expenditure; and to make provision about elections and electoral registration.
- Citation: 2009 c. 12
- Introduced by: Jack Straw MP, Secretary of State for Justice (Commons); Lord Bach (Lords)
- Territorial extent: England and Wales; Scotland; Northern Ireland; Gibraltar (in part); (Note: Section 42.)

Dates
- Royal assent: 21 July 2009
- Commencement: Various (Note: Section 43.)
Other legislation
Amends	Representation of the People Act 1983; Political Parties, Elections and Referendums Act 2000; Electoral Fraud (Northern Ireland) Act 2002; Electoral Administration Act 2006; Northern Ireland (Miscellaneous Provisions) Act 2006
Amended by	Electoral Registration and Administration Act 2013; Transparency of Lobbying, Non-Party Campaigning and Trade Union Administration Act 2014; European Parliamentary Elections Etc. (Repeal, Revocation, Amendment and Saving Provisions) (United Kingdom and Gibraltar) (EU Exit) Regulations 2018; Sentencing Act 2020; Transfer of Functions (Secretary of State for Levelling Up, Housing and Communities) Order 2021; Criminal Justice Act 2003 (Commencement No. 33) and Sentencing Act 2020 (Commencement No. 2) Regulations 2022

Status: Amended

History of passage through Parliament

Text of statute as originally enacted

Revised text of statute as amended

The Political Parties and Elections Act 2009 (c. 12) is an act of the Parliament of the United Kingdom. It implemented the proposals contained in the government white paper on "Party Finance and Expenditure in the United Kingdom" published on 16 June 2008.

== Provisions ==
The act allows the Electoral Commission to question all donors individuals to companies, in any future investigation.

The act allows for UK political parties to be required to only accept donations from individuals who pay tax in the UK. Initially this was delayed until the 2010 general election. As of 2022, provision has not come into force.

The act allowed for electoral local authorities to collect personal identifiers (such as date of birth, signature and national insurance number) alongside the existing process of household registration, in order for individual electoral registration to be implemented in the future.
