= Individual Electoral Registration =

Individual Electoral Registration (IER) is the voter registration system which took effect from 10 June 2014 in England and Wales and from 19 September 2014 in Scotland. Under the previous system, the "head of the household" was required to register all residents of the household who are eligible. Under the new system individuals are required to register themselves, as well as provide their National Insurance number and date of birth on the application form so that their identity can be verified.

== Background ==
The Westminster government had introduced IER to Northern Ireland in 2002 in the Electoral Fraud (Northern Ireland) Act 2002, but England, Wales and Scotland continued to use a system of householder registration.

The UK's politically independent Electoral Commission had been pushing for such a reform for some time. In September 2010, Mark Harper, the government's Minister for Constitutional Reform, announced the plan. A spokesman for the Electoral Reform Society, an independent NGO, expressed some reservations: "You're potentially looking at registration rates in the 50% region. It will make some problems worse.". One recent study has also suggested that it will lead to a decline in electoral registration, unless other measures are put in place to offset these reductions.

== Transition ==
The Government has stated that 35 million voters will be transferred to the new system automatically as their identity can be verified using the Department for Work and Pensions database. The remainder will be required to prove their identity in order to remain on the electoral register.

Those who were added to the register under the previous system were not removed until after the general election in May 2015.

== Legislation ==
The Cameron government introduced the Electoral Registration and Administration Bill 2012 in the Queen's Speech in May, 2012 in order to provide for the introduction of compulsory IER for those wishing to vote by post or by proxy in 2014, and compulsory IER for all registrations by 2015. The Bill passed swiftly through the House of Commons and saw its second reading in the House of Lords on 24 July 2012, having been introduced for the Coalition by the Liberal Democrat peer, Lord Wallace of Saltaire. It passed committee stage on 14 January 2013, and received Royal Assent on 31 January 2013 thereby passing into law as the Electoral Registration and Administration Act 2013.
