= Electoral Commission (United Kingdom) =

Independent agency that regulates the electoral process in the United Kingdom

The Electoral Commission
- Electoral Commission's logo

Agency overview
- Formed: 2001
- Jurisdiction: United Kingdom
- Headquarters: 3 Bunhill Row, London, EC1Y 8YZ
- Employees: 256 (July 2025)
- Annual budget: £18.4 million (estimate 2019–20)
- Agency executive: Vijay Rangarajan, Chief Executive Officer
- Website: electoralcommission.org.uk

In the United Kingdom, the Electoral Commission is the national election commission, created in 2001 as a result of the Political Parties, Elections and Referendums Act 2000. It is an independent agency that regulates party and election finance and sets standards for how elections should be run.

== Creation ==
The Electoral Commission was created in 2001 following a recommendation by the fifth report of the Committee on Standards in Public Life. Its mandate was set out in the Political Parties, Elections and Referendums Act 2000 (PPERA), and ranges from the regulation of political donations and expenditure by political and third parties through to promoting greater participation in the electoral process. The Electoral Administration Act 2006 required local authorities to review all polling stations, and to provide a report on the reviews to the Electoral Commission.

The Political Parties and Elections Act 2009 granted the Electoral Commission a variety of new supervisory and investigatory powers. It also allowed for the appointment of four new electoral commissioners who are nominated by political parties.

== Responsibilities and objectives ==
=== Integrity and transparency of party election finance ===
As the regulator of political party funding in the UK, the Commission's role is to ensure the integrity and transparency of party and election finance.

Political parties must submit annual statements of accounts, detailing income and expenditure, to the Electoral Commission. The Commission publishes these on its website. Political parties and regulated donees are required to submit reports of all donations they receive to the Commission. The Commission maintains a publicly available and searchable register of these donations on its website.

At general elections to the Parliament of the United Kingdom, Scottish Parliament, Welsh Parliament and Northern Ireland Assembly political parties are required to submit campaign spending returns to the Electoral Commission. Prior to the United Kingdom leaving the European Union, this also applied to parties contesting elections to the European Parliament.

The Political Parties, Elections and Referendums Act 2000 establishes a number of restrictions on donations, in particular that parties may only receive donations from permissible donors, with donations from foreign donors explicitly forbidden.

The Commission may impose financial civil penalties on political parties and their accounting units if they fail to submit donation and loans returns, campaign spending return or statements of account. The Commission also has the power to seek forfeiture of impermissible donations accepted by political parties.

=== Registering political parties ===
The Commission registers political parties and regulates party compliance. The Commission maintains the registers of political parties in Great Britain and Northern Ireland.

=== Electoral registers and the electoral registration process ===
The Electoral Commission produces guidance and gives advice on electoral registration to electoral registration officers in Great Britain. The Commission has published performance standards for electoral registration in Great Britain. Electoral registration officers are required to report against these standards and the Commission will make this information publicly available.

As part of this work, the Commission runs a series of public awareness campaigns ahead of elections and throughout the year to encourage people to register to vote. These focus on audiences that research indicates are less likely to be on the electoral register, including recent home-movers, students and UK citizens living overseas.

=== Well-run elections and referendums ===
The Commission produces guidance and gives advice on electoral administration to returning officers and electoral administrators in Great Britain. The Commission has set performance standards for returning officers and referendum counting officers in Great Britain. These standards do not apply to local government elections in Scotland as they are a devolved matter. The Commission has a statutory duty to produce reports on the administration of certain elections (for example UK Parliamentary general elections) and may be asked to report on other types of election (such as local government elections).

=== EU seat distribution ===
The Electoral Commission was responsible for recommending which regions were allocated how many of the 73 seats that the United Kingdom held at the European Parliament. The UK left the EU on 31 January 2020.

=== Referendum responsibilities ===
The Electoral Commission has a number of responsibilities in relation to referendums. These include:

- commenting on the wording of the referendum question (the government is responsible for proposing the wording)
- registration of campaigners
- designating lead campaign organisations and the making of grants
- monitoring referendum expenditure limits and donations
- certifying and announcing the result.
- As with other electoral events, the Electoral Commission has a statutory duty to prepare and publish a report on the administration of a relevant referendum and to give guidance and advice to administrators and campaigners.
- The chair of the commission, or someone appointed by the chair, will also be appointed as Chief Counting Officer.

As of 2017, the Electoral Commission has overseen the holding of two UK-wide referendums. The first was the 2011 AV Referendum, and the second and most notable was the 2016 EU Referendum. On both occasions the then chair of the Electoral Commission Jenny Watson acted as the appointed Chief Counting Officer. The Commission also oversaw the 2004 North East England Devolution Referendum, the 2011 Welsh Devolution Referendum and also the 2014 Scottish Independence Referendum. The commission has no legal position in the legislation concerning referendums proposed by the devolved Scottish and Welsh administrations.

== Organisation ==
From 1 October 2010, additional Commissioners serve on a part-time basis, nominated by the leaders of political parties, scrutinised by the Speaker's Committee on the Electoral Commission and approved by the House of Commons by means of an Address to the King requesting their appointment. Those nominated by the three largest parties serve terms of four years, while the Commissioner nominated by a smaller party serves for a two-year term. The appointments of nominated Commissioners are renewable once.

The current Commissioners are:

- John Pullinger
- Dame Sue Bruce
- Roseanna Cunningham
- Alan Mabbutt
- Carole Mills
- Rashik Parmar
- Dr Katy Radford
- Shelia Ritchie
- Chris Ruane
- Professor Dame Elan Closs Stephens CBE

=== National commissions ===
To reflect the views of stakeholders and the distinctive procedures and practices in the countries of the United Kingdom there are devolved electoral commissions for Scotland, Wales and Northern Ireland.

=== English regional offices ===
Since February 2007, the Commission has had regional offices across England in the South West, Eastern and South East, London, Midlands, and North of England regions.

=== Speaker's Committee on the Electoral Commission ===
The Electoral Commission is answerable to Parliament via the Speaker's Committee (established by PPERA 2000). The Commission must submit an annual estimate of income and expenditure to the Committee. The Committee, made up of Members of Parliament, is responsible for answering questions on behalf of the Commission. The Member who takes questions for the Speaker's Committee is Bridget Phillipson.

=== Parliamentary Parties Panels ===
The Parliamentary Parties Panel (PPP) is composed of representatives from all parliamentary political parties with two or more sitting MPs. The PPP was established by PPERA and meets quarterly to submit views to the Commission on matters affecting political parties.

There are equivalent non-statutory bodies for the devolved legislatures in Wales (Senedd Political Parties Panel), Scotland (Scottish Parliament Political Parties Panel), and Northern Ireland (Northern Ireland Assembly Parties Panel). The latter two are composed of representatives from all parliamentary political parties, without qualifying thresholds.

== Criticism ==
There was widespread controversy surrounding the 2010 UK general election including allegations of fraudulent postal voting, polling stations being unprepared for an evening surge of voters, policing of voters protesting at one polling station, and only enough ballot papers for 80% of voters. The Electoral Commission was criticised for its handling of the election.

The Electoral Commission has been criticised by Nigel Vinson for perceived partisanship, and by Peter Bone for investigations into several notable figures on the Vote Leave Campaign.

In September 2018 the High Court ruled that the Electoral Commission had misinterpreted the rules prior to the referendum taking place in advice it gave to the Vote Leave campaign, allowing them to break the law without even being aware.

On 13 May 2020, during Prime Minister's Questions, Conservative MP Peter Bone attacked the Electoral Commission for its investigations into four separate members of pro-Leave campaigns, who were all found innocent of any wrongdoing. He called the commission "politically corrupt, totally biased and morally bankrupt". Prime Minister Boris Johnson responded by saying that he had hoped "all those who spent so much time and energy drawing attention to their supposed guilt would spend just as long drawing attention to their genuine innocence".

On 29 August 2020, Co-Chairman of the Conservative Party Amanda Milling called for major reform of the Commission in a piece in The Telegraph, accusing the organisation of a "lack of accountability" and of operating by an "unclear rulebook".

== Proposed changes to legislation governing the Commission ==
In February 2022, the Commission sent a public letter to ministers expressing concern about proposed changes to legislation governing the operation of the Commission. The letter said that the proposed provision in the elections bill for ministers to draw up a "strategy and policy statement", enabling the government to guide the work of the Commission, was "inconsistent with the role that an independent electoral commission plays in a healthy democracy". The letter was signed by the full board of the Commission except the Conservative peer Stephen Gilbert. The bill became the Elections Act 2022.

== Electoral register data breach ==
In 2021–2022 the commission computer system was attacked by APT31.

In March 2024, the UK government and the United States Department of the Treasury's Office of Foreign Assets Control (OFAC) jointly sanctioned a Chinese Ministry of State Security front company called Wuhan Xiaoruizhi Science and Technology and affiliated individuals for breaching the Electoral Commission and placing malware in critical infrastructure.

== See also ==
- Election commission for similar organizations in other countries
- Political events overseen by the Electoral Commission:
  - Elections in the United Kingdom
  - Referendums in the United Kingdom
- Category:Boundary commissions in the United Kingdom
