= Electoral system of Scotland =

Aspect of politics in Scotland

The country of Scotland uses different electoral systems for elections to the Scottish Parliament, the UK Parliament and to local councils. A different system was also in use between 1999 and 2019 for elections to the European Parliament.

Historically, only first-past-the-post (FPTP) was used for all elections in Scotland, but this changed in 1999 both with the introduction of D'Hondt elections to the EU Parliament and the inception the same year of the devolved Scottish Parliament. Two of the devolved legislatures in the United Kingdom – the Scottish Parliament and the Senedd – use the additional member system (AMS). AMS has been used for every Scottish Parliament election since 1999, with the most recent being in 2026. Local council elections were reformed to be held under single transferable vote (STV), which has proven to be proportional, unlike FPTP. Elections to the UK Parliament are still held under FPTP. This has led to the Scottish National Party (SNP) dominating Scottish seats in the UK Parliament. The SNP won 48 out of 59 seats in Scotland in 2019, while the Conservative Party won 6 seats, the Liberal Democrats won 4 seats, and Labour won 1 seat.

The history of using first-past-the-post in UK Parliament elections in Scotland means that the development of political parties in Scotland was affected to some extent by Duverger's Law, which causes the agglomeration of related political ideologies into a few large parties with many small parties rarely winning representation, though a four party system did develop in Scotland prior to the introduction of voting reform.

== Scottish Parliament elections ==
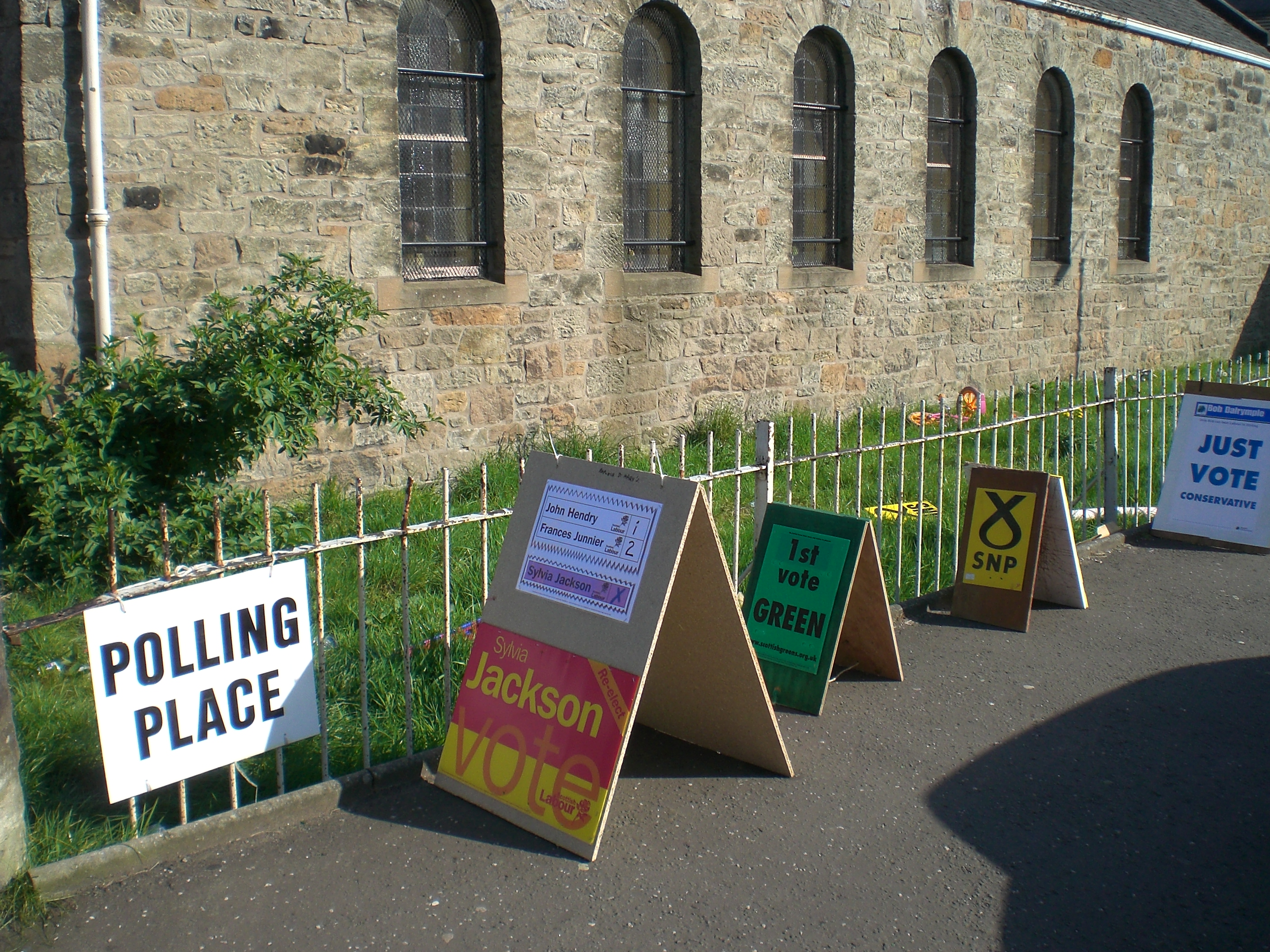
A polling station in Stirling on the day of the 2007 Scottish Parliament election

The Scottish Parliament uses the additional member system (AMS), a compensatory form of proportional representation, to elect MSPs. The electorate have two votes to cast on a Scottish Parliamentary election day, one for a constituency MSP and one for a Regional list MSP.

It consists of 73 FPTP constituencies and 8 regional lists. A total of 56 regional MSPs are elected to represent the eight regional constituencies of the Scottish Parliament. The 8 regions are:

- Glasgow
- Edinburgh and Lothians East
- Central Scotland and Lothians West
- South Scotland
- Highlands and Islands
- Mid-Scotland and Fife
- West Scotland
- North East Scotland

All together, every area of Scotland has 8 MSPs (1 regional and 7 constituency). A voter is given two ballot papers, one peach coloured and the other lilac. On the constituency ballot the voter has to put a cross in the box next to one of the candidates they want to represent them. On the regional list ballot the voter does the same, but for the party they want to represent them. The regional list ballot paper is usually a lot longer than the constituency ballot paper as smaller parties have more of a chance of being elected on the regional list.

The method of calculating which parties win regional list seats is called the 'D'Hondt' method. The specific method used for Scottish Parliament regions gives preference to parties which haven't won any constituency seats in the region. When casting a vote for a regional list MSP, voters do not vote for a specific individual like they do when voting for their constituency MSP, rather, they vote for a political party. The only exception to this is when an independent candidate is standing for election on the regional list ballot.

The Additional Member System of voting doesn't always provide a proportional result, as parties can obtain a higher seat share than vote share. In the early years of the Scottish Parliament, Scottish Labour was the main beneficiary, but by 2026 the SNP and Green reached a peak level of disproportional representation.

Members of the Scottish Parliament were formerly permitted to serve as Members of Parliament in the House of Commons. This has been disallowed since the passage of the Scottish Elections (Representation and Reform) Act 2025.

== Local Council elections ==
Elections to Scotland's 32 councils are held under Single Transferable Vote (STV). All wards in Scotland are multi-member wards, meaning there are multiple councillors per area.

Under this system, voters must number their candidates by preference. First-preference votes are counted and the candidates with the least get eliminated, so the first-preference votes for the candidates get ignored and their second preferences get counted instead. This continues for many rounds until one candidate wins.

This has proven to be more proportional than many other systems and small parties and independents have a lot of representation in local councils due to the system, for example Highlands Council is run by a collaboration agreement between independents and the Scottish National Party (SNP).

== UK Parliament elections ==
All elections to the UK Parliament are held under First Past the Post (FPTP). There was a referendum in 2011 proposing to change the electoral system to Alternative Vote, which returned a result in favour of keeping FPTP.

There has been reluctance from both Labour and Conservative (UK) Governments to back electoral reform, it has been argued this is because they heavily benefit from FPTP.

Under this system, voters put a cross in the box next to the candidate they want to represent their constituency, and the candidate with the most votes wins. Parties with less than 50% of the vote commonly get a large majority of seats and form the government. For example, in the 1997 General election, Tony Blair's Labour Party won 43.2% of the vote, but 63.4% of seats in parliament.
