= Opinion polls on the British national identity card =

National identity cards were introduced in the United Kingdom during World War II, when the government took the view that considerations of national security justified obliging people to carry them. They were withdrawn by the third Churchill administration in 1952 because of the tension that they created between the public and the police. There were several proposals to reintroduce them over the following years, resisted by campaigning organisations such as NO2ID.

The Identity Cards Act 2006 reintroduced compulsory identity cards for workers in certain high-risk sectors, as part of a counterterrorism initiative by the then Prime Minister, Tony Blair (in response to the September 11 attacks in 2001 and 7/7 bombings in July 2005). The Act was subsequently repealed by the Cameron-Clegg coalition in the Identity Documents Act 2010.

In 2018, the question was raised again, with articles in The Economist and The Times considering whether it might help address concerns about citizenship and migration, particularly in the light of the Windrush scandal. At the end of April 2018, two former Home Secretaries, Charles Clarke and Alan Johnson called for a rethink on ID cards, saying that immigration targets would be useless without them. In September 2018, former Home Secretary Amber Rudd added her voice, saying that "Britain should adopt a new high-tech version of ID cards to tackle fraud, illegal immigration and welfare abuse." This was followed by similar considerations from another Home Office minister, Caroline Nokes, in 2019.

== 2003 ==
The announcement of the scheme followed a public consultation, particularly among "stakeholder groups". At March 2003 the government stated that the overall results were:

in favour: 2606 responses (61%)
against: 1587 responses (38%)
neutral: 48 responses (1%)

== 2004 ==
Some polls have indicated that public opinion on the issue varies across the UK. The 2004 State of the Nation poll by the Joseph Rowntree Reform Trust showed that opinion in Scotland was far less supportive than that in the rest of the UK.

In a poll for Detica conducted by MORI in March 2004 showed that 80% of those polled were in favour of a national identity card (11% opposed), although 67% of them have little or no knowledge about the Government's proposed national ID card scheme. Furthermore, only 54% were prepared to pay for a card, with 80% unwilling to pay more than £25. 83% were in favour of carrying the card at all times, though only 44% were in favour of the police being given powers to see it on demand. 58% doubted that the Government could bring in such a scheme smoothly.

In May 2004 a YouGov poll for Privacy International indicated that 61% of the population supported compulsory identity cards. However, in respect of the database maintenance elements, 47% opposed the legal requirement to notify a change of address (compared to 41% in favour), while 45% were against the legal requirement to report lost, stolen or damaged cards (44% in favour). 27% of those polled were 'strongly opposed' to fines. In the under 30 age group, 61% were opposed to fines. Of those opposing the scheme (percentage unstated), 28% would take part in demonstrations, 16% would take part in civil disobedience, and 6% would prefer prison to registering.

== 2005 ==
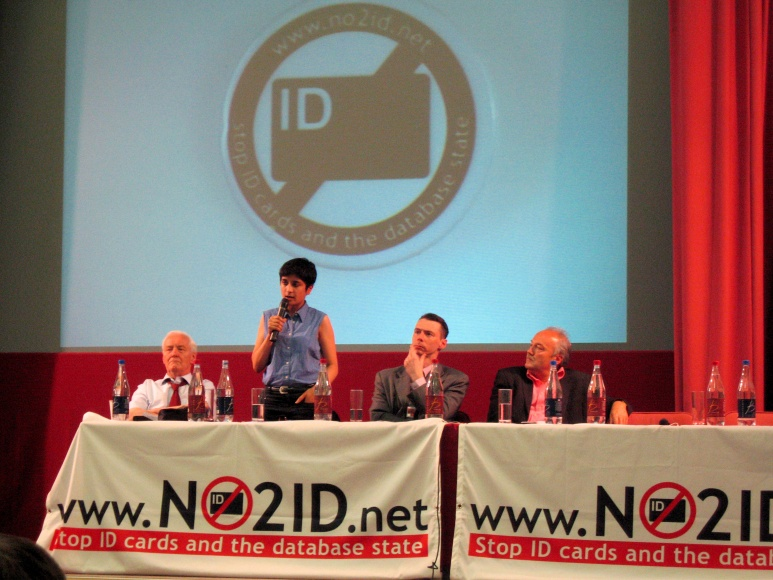
Meeting in London against ID cards, 2005.

National opinion polls suggest that the expected cost of the cards affects levels of support. An estimate from the Home Office placed the cost of a 10-year passport and ID card package at £85, while after the 2005 General Election in May 2005 they issued a revised figure of over £93, and announced that a "standalone" ID card would cost £30. Two polls conducted by TNS at the end of 2005 amongst British Citizens and Foreign Residents demonstrated over 65% support for identity cards backed by a central database with a cost of an identity card at £30 and a passport/identity card package at approximately £100. However, the research conducted by MORI in 2004 showed that only 20% were willing to pay more than £25. The publicised costs also do not include an estimated £30 for processing fees, making the total costs up to £60 for a standalone card, and £123 for a passport/identity card.

A 2005 poll on the BBC web site indicated that of the nearly 9,000 votes, 17% were in favour and 83% were against Do you support ID cards?. However, the wording under the poll result states that results of such uncontrolled polls cannot be taken as indicative of public opinion.

Before the July 2005 London bombings, a Daily Telegraph/YouGov poll showed that 66% of people were opposed to the scheme if it cost £6bn and 81% opposed if it cost £10–19bn.

== 2006 ==
In February 2006, a YouGov/Daily Telegraph poll indicated that public support for the scheme had fallen to 52% (with 37% opposed), despite 60% of those polled stating that those with nothing to hide should have no objection to the scheme. It revealed that the following percentages of people thought that the scheme would:

- 64% – cut benefit fraud
- 62% – cut health tourism
- 55% – cut bogus asylum-seekers
- 43% – help catch criminals
- 42% – will make life simpler and more convenient
- 21% – cut chances of terrorist atrocities

At the same time, it showed that the following percentages thought:

- 80% – determined criminals and terrorists will forge the cards
- 74% – the scheme will be enormously expensive
- 71% – information will be hacked or leaked
- 61% – information will be improperly passed to foreign governments
- 60% – will be time consuming and inconvenient
- 55% – will contain incorrect information
- 51% – card readers will often malfunction or read inaccurately

In July 2006, an ICM poll indicated that public support had fallen further to 46%, with opposition growing to 51%:

Q1. The government has proposed the introduction of identity cards that in combination with your passport, will cost around £93. From what you have seen or heard do you think the proposal is...?

- Very good idea 12%
- Good idea 34%
- Bad idea 29%
- Very bad idea 22%

Q2. As part of the National Identity Scheme the government has also proposed that everyone is required to attend an interview to give personal details about themselves for use by the police, tax authorities and all other government departments. From what you have seen or heard do you think that this is a..?

- Very good idea 10%
- Good idea 31%
- Bad idea 33%
- Very bad idea 23%

A further poll by YouGov/The Daily Telegraph, published on 4 December 2006, indicated support for the identity card element of the scheme at 50%, with 39% opposed. Support for the national database was weaker, with 41% happy and 52% unhappy with the prospect of having their data recorded. Only 11% trusted the government to keep the data confidential. 3.12% of the sample were prepared to undergo long prison sentences rather than have a card.

=== Identity Cards Act 2006 ===
Identity cards were re-introduced in British law in the Identity Cards Act 2006, enacted during Tony Blair's third Labour government, as part of its counterterrorism initiative (part of the "war on terror", in response to the September 11 attacks and 7 July 2005 London bombings). Only workers in certain high-security professions, such as airport workers, were required to have an identity card in 2009. As of May 2022, it is not evident that any opinion polling has been carried out on this Act.

== 2010 ==
The 2006 Act was repealed by the Identity Documents Act 2010 during the Conservative–Liberal Democrat coalition of 2010, following opposition to ID cards from the then-Deputy Prime Minister Nick Clegg and Prime Minister David Cameron. Although the Act ends the validity of ID cards as travel documents, no action was to be taken to withdraw the National Identity Cards already issued.

== 2018 ==
A YouGov survey for The Times found a majority in favour of reintroducing identity cards, with high levels of support for granting extra powers and tools to the security services. "The survey reveals that most people would support the compulsory carrying of ID cards, with 57% support among the control group and 61–63% among those who were asked the crime/terrorism variants."

== 2022 ==
The Elections Act 2022 requires voters to show photo ID at UK Parliamentary elections, police and crime commissioner elections and at local elections in England. The act was criticised in Parliament for permitting as acceptable voter identification "an Older Person’s Bus Pass, an Oyster 60+ Card, a Freedom Pass", while not allowing 18+ student Oyster cards, national railcards, or student ID cards. An amendment in the House of Lords to list these as accepted forms of voter identification was rejected by Boris Johnson's second Conservative government. As of May 2022, it is not evident that any opinion polling has been carried out on this Act.
