= Scottish National Entitlement Card =

Scottish smart card scheme

The Scottish National Entitlement Card (NEC) is a Scotland-wide smart card scheme run by Scottish local authorities on behalf of the Scottish Government. It is predominantly operated as a concessionary travel pass, but can also act as proof of age for young people (Young Scot NEC) and give access to civic services such as libraries and leisure centres depending on the local authority.

== History ==
In 2000, the then Scottish Executive assigned budget for a Modernising Government Fund intended to improve public services; part of this budget was targeted towards the development of a voluntary public sector smartcard, an initiative that in 2003 was highlighted as an area to be developed further by local authorities. In parallel, s.40 of the Transport (Scotland) Act 2005 provided for the introduction of national travel concession schemes that would be funded centrally rather than by local authorities, and it was decided that what was by then known as the National Entitlement Card would be used to administer the travel scheme when it was introduced in 2006.

== Privacy concerns ==
The parallel development of a local authority administered Citizen Account under the Modernising Government Fund had by 2006 articulated a need to assign their records a Unique Citizen Reference Number or UCRN, and envisaged associating the Account with "nationally compatible smart cards as service access tokens". The UCRN is maintained as part of Scotland's National Health Service Central Register (NHSCR) data; access to a subset of the Register by Scottish Local Authorities was enabled by s.57 of the Local Electoral Administration and Registration Services (Scotland) Act 2006 (the LEARS act). Each Scot on NHSCR is assigned a Unique Citizen Reference Number (UCRN) which local authorities have access to under certain conditions. As the UCRN itself may be linked to NHSCR data and used for verification purposes, a proposed expansion of its use in 2014 raised fears that the UCRN will form the backbone of a Scottish identity register and persistent identification of individuals across Scottish state datasets. The Open Rights Group accused the proposal of creating "a national ID system by the backdoor", despite the Scottish Government's opposition to the UK's previous identity cards scheme. In February 2017 it was announced that the proposed expansion was not to go ahead.

== National concessionary travel ==
=== Older and Disabled Persons ===
The Scottish NEC allows those Scottish residents with certain disabilities or aged over 60 years old to access free travel within Scotland on nearly all local bus and scheduled long distance coach services (including the morning rush hour) but excluding premium fare night buses and sightseeing buses. Travel is also valid on bus services that start/terminate in Carlisle and Berwick upon Tweed so long as the service travels to/from Scotland.

==== Eligibility Criteria - Disabled Cardholders ====
===== Cardholder =====
Entitlement for free bus travel with the NEC is dependent on being a Scottish resident, at least 5 years old, and meeting one of the following criteria:

- Receiving certain Department for Work and Pensions or Social Security Scotland benefits:
  - Attendance Allowance
  - War Pension Constant Attendance Allowance
  - Disability Living Allowance or Scottish Adult Disability Living Allowance, with the higher rate of the mobility component, or the middle or higher rate of the care component.
  - Personal Independence Payment
  - Adult Disability Payment
  - Child Disability Payment, with the higher rate of the mobility component, or the middle or higher rate of the care component.
  - Pension Age Disability Payment, with the lower or higher rate of the care component.
- Living in a care or residential home or hospital, and eligible for one of the above benefits.
- Holding a Blue Badge issued in the UK or by an EU member state.
- Being profoundly or severely deaf.
- Having a visual impairment.
- Been told not to drive based on medical grounds.
- Having a mental health condition recognised under the Mental Health (Care and Treatment) (Scotland) Act 2003 which has lasted for more than 12 months.
- Having a learning disability and needing to travel to attend appointments and activities.
- Having a terminal illness, and receiving one of the above benefits or being registered on a Scottish hospice register.
- Having a progressive degenerative condition.
- Having lost one or more limbs.
- Being an injured veteran with mobility problems, and having received a lump sum payment.
- Receiving a War Pensioner Mobility Supplement.

===== Companion =====
If the main cardholder meets any of the following criteria, they are also entitled to have a companion travel with them for free:

- Receiving certain Department for Work and Pensions or Social Security Scotland benefits:
  - Attendance Allowance
  - War Pensions Constant Attendance Allowance
  - Disability Living Allowance or Scottish Adult Disability Living Allowance, with the middle or higher rate of the care component.
  - Personal Independence Payment or Adult Disability Payment, with the standard or enhanced rate of the daily living component.
  - Child Disability Payment, with the middle or higher rate of the care component.
  - Pension Age Disability Payment, with the lower or higher rate of the care component.
- Living in a care or residential home or hospital and eligible for one of the above benefits.
- Being severely sight impaired (blind).

==== Eligibility Criteria - 60+ Cardholders ====
To get a National Entitlement Card you must be:

- Aged 60 years or older, and
- Resident in Scotland.

=== Young People ===
Until 31 January 2022, all Scottish residents aged 16–18 years old and full-time volunteers aged between 19 and 26 years old were able to get discounted bus and rail fares, via the Young Scot NEC.

After 31 January 2022, all Scottish residents aged 5–21 years are able to travel on access free bus transport in Scotland using either the Young Scot NEC or the National Entitlement Card. Children under 5 already get free bus fares.

Full-time volunteers from 22–26 years old are still able to get discounted bus and rail fares and, 16–18 years old are able to get discounted rail fares, as this carries on from the previous scheme.

=== Ferry Concessions ===
Residents of the Western Isles, Orkney and Shetland also receive two free return ferry trips to the Scottish mainland if they receive free bus travel or the Young Scot travel discount.

== Local concessionary travel ==
In some areas of Scotland, additional concessionary travel options are available. For example, 60+ and Disabled Persons National Entitlement Cards issued to those residing in the Strathclyde Partnership for Transport (SPT) area gives access to additional rail and Glasgow Subway concessions. Similarly, all NECs issued by the City of Edinburgh Council entitle the holder to free travel with Edinburgh Trams.

== Young Scot National Entitlement Card ==
Young Scot is the national youth information and citizenship charity for 11 to 25 year olds in Scotland. All young people of this age who live in Scotland are eligible to receive a free Young Scot National Entitlement Card (Young Scot NEC).

The Young Scot NEC is issued under the Proof of Age Standards Scheme and can therefore be used by a young person to access to age-restricted goods and services. In addition to the travel concessions for Young People when they are eligible, the card also entitles the holder to a number of services and discounts provided by the European Youth Card Association.

Young people who living in Scotland and are under 22 years old are eligible for free nationwide bus travel. Young people need a Scottish National Entitlement Card or Young Scot National Entitlement Card to travel.

== Other local NEC uses ==
The NEC has been used for a number of different additional purposes since its introduction. Common uses include access to cashless catering in schools, a means of providing library or leisure membership, or discounted admissions on the basis of age or disability. In other local authority areas, the card may only be used for the national purposes outlined above. Local authorities will normally issue the NEC when a valid application for a service using the NEC is received.

Scottish National Entitlement Cards issued for the purpose of concessionary travel (including 60+, disabled or under 22s NECs) can also be used as identification in UK General Elections.

== Card issuing authorities ==
Aberdeen City Council; Aberdeenshire Council; Angus Council; City of Edinburgh Council; Clackmannanshire Council; Comhairle nan Eilean Siar (Western Isles); Dumfries & Galloway Council; Dundee City Council; East Lothian Council; Falkirk Council; Fife Council; Highland Council; Midlothian Council; Moray Council; Orkney Islands Council; Perth & Kinross Council; Scottish Borders Council	Shetland Islands Council; Stirling Council; Strathclyde Partnership for Transport (SPT) - Issues cards on behalf of: East Ayrshire Council; East Dunbartonshire Council; East Renfrewshire Council; Glasgow City Council; Inverclyde Council; North Ayrshire Council; North Lanarkshire Council; Renfrewshire Council; South Ayrshire Council; South Lanarkshire Council; West Dunbartonshire Council; Helensburgh and Lomond area of Argyll and Bute Council; West Lothian Council

== See also ==
- National Health Service Central Register (Scotland)
- Identity Cards Act 2006
- Accepted forms of photo ID in UK elections
