= Louise Macdonald =

First female National Director of the Institute of Directors

Louise Macdonald OBE, FRSE
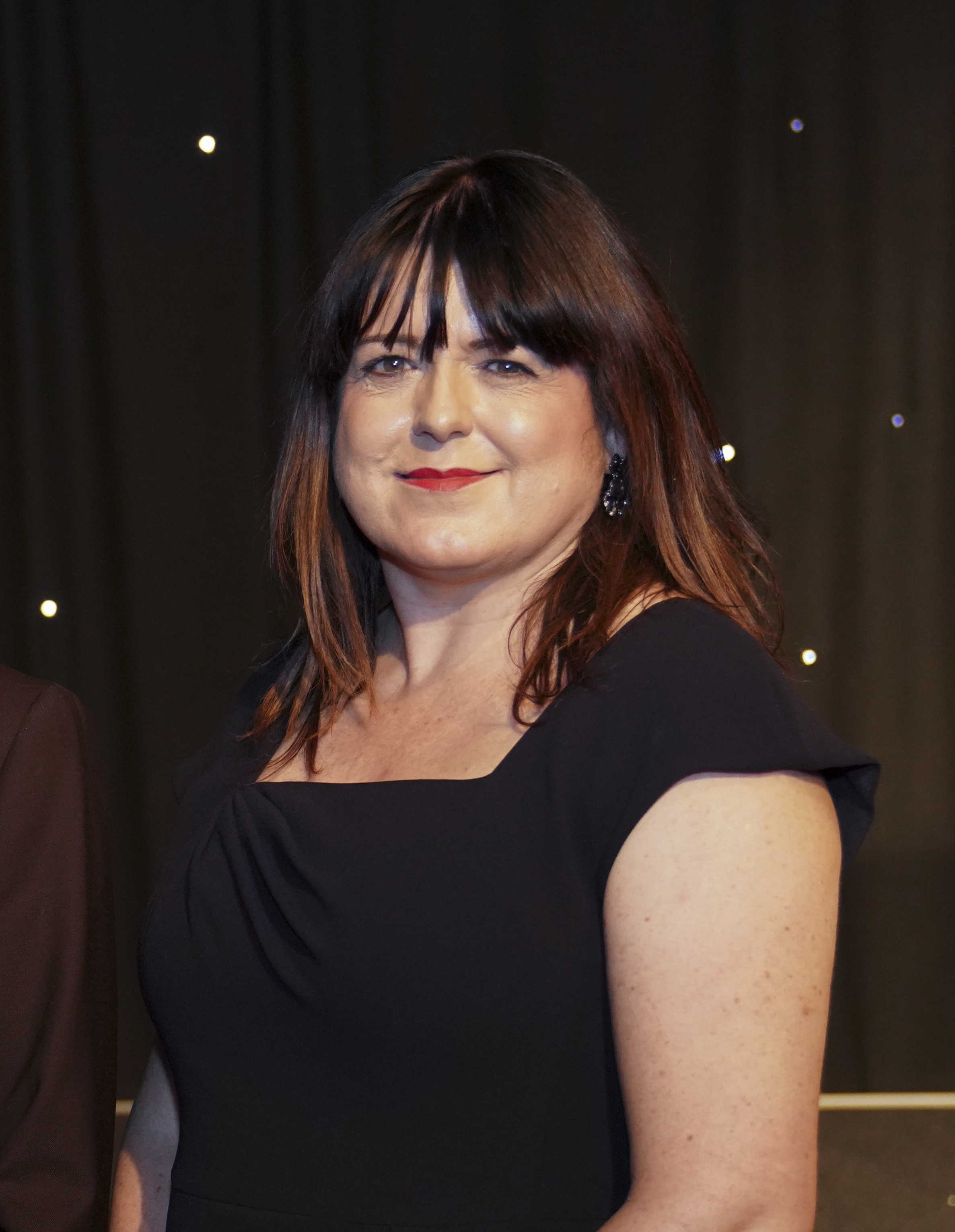
- Louise Macdonald on 29 January 2020
- Other name: Mary Louise Macdonald (Louise Halliday)
- Occupation: National Director of the Institute of Directors Scotland
- Known for: Previously CEO of Young Scot. Co-chair of the Scottish National Advisory Council for Women and Girls, first female National Director of IOD

Louise Macdonald, OBE, FRSE became the National Director of the Institute of Directors (IOD) in Scotland, and was made a Fellow of the Royal Society of Edinburgh (RSE) in 2021. Her appointment has made her the first female to hold the role of National Director. For ten years she was the CEO of Young Scot, the award-winning national charitable organisation for citizenship for people in Scotland, aged 11–26. She was awarded an OBE for her services to youth, in the 2015 New Years Honours.

In 2017 she received an Honorary Doctorate from Edinburgh Napier University

Macdonald is an Independent co-chair of the Scottish Government National Advisory Council for Women and Girls (NACWG).

Macdonald had been named the Third Sector Director of the Year in the IOD UK Awards in 2016. And she was elected in 2017 to be the president of the European Youth Card Association, covering 39 countries and 7 million young people.

She is a former board member of Scottish Parliament's Scotland's Futures Forum.

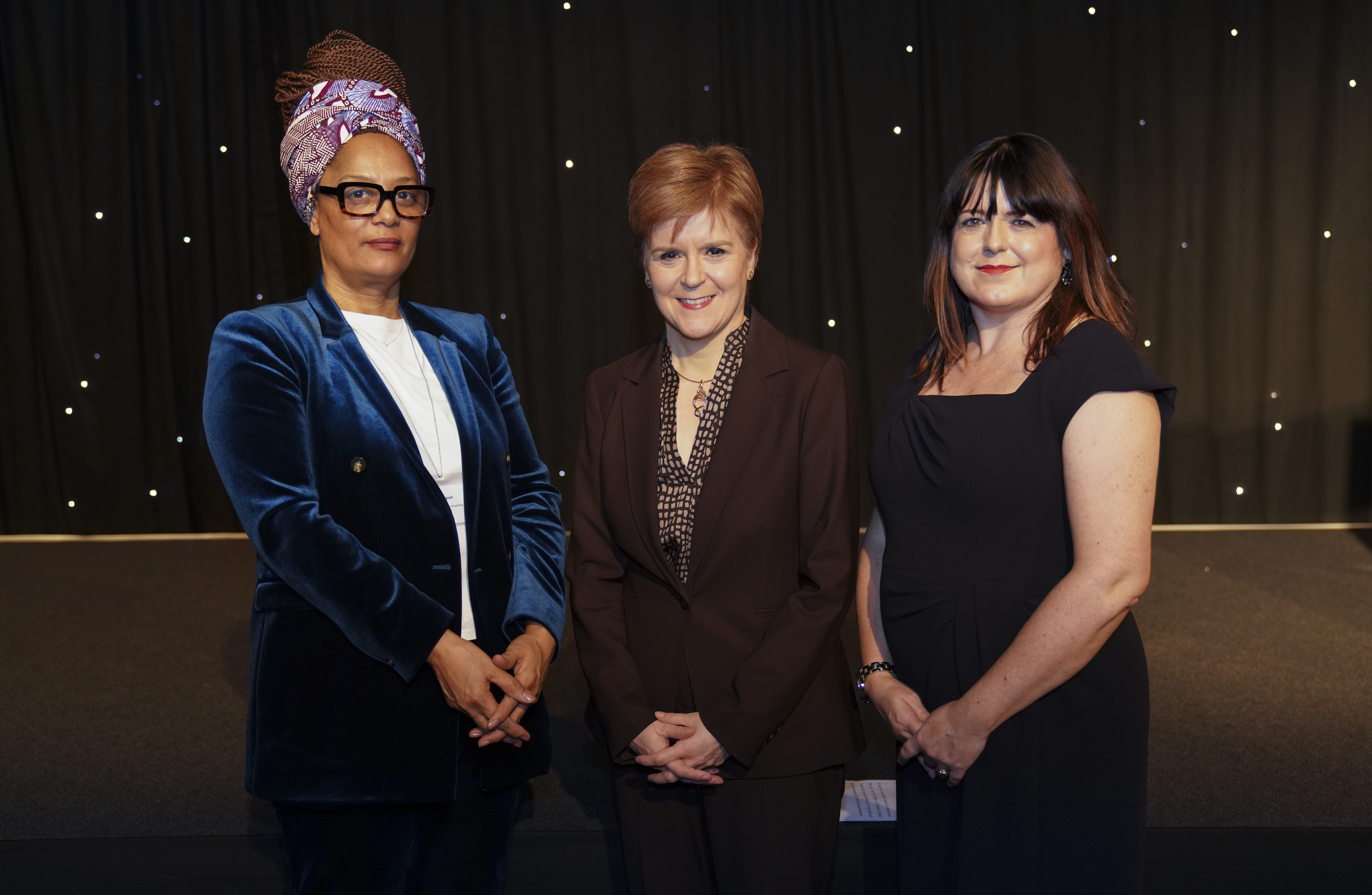
First Minister Nicola Sturgeon (centre) with co-chairs of NACWG; Macdonald is on the right

Under Macdonald's co-leadership, NACWG has been an advocate for increasing the powers of the Scottish Government around equality legislation. In releasing the council's third report (January 2021), she is quoted as saying that findings of endemic bias should be countered by 'systemic changes, to help pave the way for intersectional gender equality for all in Scotland, especially those who are too often ignored or forgotten within the current system.'

Macdonald was described by the IOD's Chairman, Aidan O’Carroll as a well-connected 'force for meaningful and continuous engagement' and was also said to be 'well respected in the business community'.

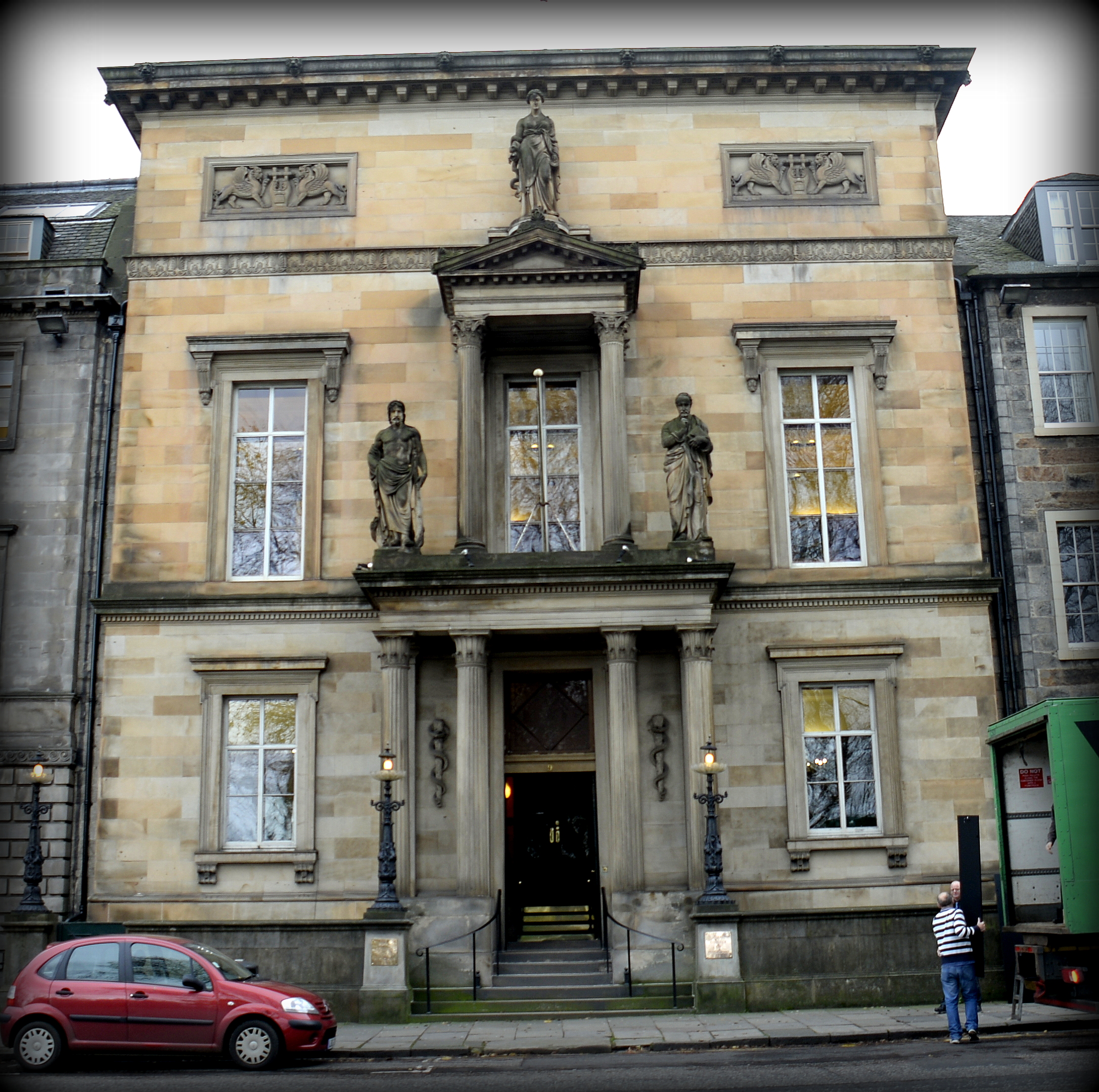
Royal College of Physicians of Edinburgh, new premises of IOD

Her appointment coincided with the IOD operations, which she is now managing, moving into the Royal College of Physicians of Edinburgh, building on Queen Street Edinburgh.

Within RSE, she co-convenes their Post-COVID-19 Public Debate & Participation working party, as part of their Post-COVID-19 Futures Commission, and on being made a Fellow she indicated that she would support the Royal Society's wider engagement, consultation and inclusion of young people in its work.

In August 2021, she became the first ambassador for the Scottish Seabird Centre, a coastal and marine conservation and outreach organisation based in North Berwick.

== Background ==
Under Macdonald's ten years in leadership, Young Scot grew to cover two thirds of eligible young people in Scotland, with 670,000 members, and includes a national entitlement card, which can also be used as 'proof of age'.

Her previous career included working in journalism, as well as in youth volunteering and youth activism engagement. She is also interested in photography and nature.
