= National Health Service Central Register =

The National Health Service Central Register (NHSCR) is a Scottish Government database accessible to public bodies approved by the Scottish Parliament. The register was established in the early 1950s to facilitate the transfer of patients between health board areas or across borders within the countries of the United Kingdom. However, its role has expanded over the decades and it now also provides Scottish local authorities with a Unique Citizen Reference Number or UCRN used to identify people on their own databases.

In 2006, the Scottish Government and the National Records of Scotland made a major expansion of the applications of the NHSCR by changing regulations with section 57 of the Local Electoral Administration and Registration Services (Scotland) Act 2006. In 2015, the Scottish Government proposed expanding access to the NHSCR to more than 100 additional public bodies. The associated consultation received 302 responses. The proposed expansion was criticised by the Open Rights Group, who believed it may breach data protection rules and human rights and resembles a national identity system. In February 2017, the Scottish Government informed the Scottish Parliament that it did not intend to proceed with the proposals.

== Community Health Index ==
The Community Health Index is a register of all patients in NHS Scotland, Scotland's publicly funded healthcare system. The register exists to ensure that patients can be correctly identified, and that all information pertaining to a patient's health is available to providers of care.

Patients are identified using a ten-digit number known as the CHI Number, pronounced /ˈkaɪ/. This number is normally formed using the patient's date of birth (as DDMMYY), followed by four digits: two digits randomly generated, the third digit identifying gender (odd for men, even for women) and a check digit (Modulus-11). As of March 2010, uptake of this number (based on radiology requests) varied across Scotland from 96.5% to 99.9% depending on the local NHS Board.

=== Pharmacy ===
The CHI number is included in electronic medical referencing systems, such as AMS (Acute Medicine Service), CMS (Chronic Medicine Service) and MAS (Minor Ailment Scheme). All of these connect to Scotland's ePharmacy which contains details of all medical patients for Scotland.

== See also ==
- NHS number
- Registration district
- Scottish National Entitlement Card
