= ContactPoint =

Former government database in England

ContactPoint was a government database in England that provided a way for those working with children and young people to find out who else is working with the same child or young person, making it easier to deliver more coordinated support. It was created in response to the abuse and death of eight-year-old Victoria Climbié in 2000 in England. Various agencies involved in her care had failed to prevent her death, in particular by individually never realising other agencies had been in contact with Victoria.

ContactPoint aimed to improve child protection by improving the way information about children was shared between services. It was designed by Capgemini and previously had the working titles of Information Sharing Index (or IS Index or ISI) and the Children's Index. The database, created under the Children Act 2004, cost £224m to set up and £41m a year to run. It operated in 150 local authorities, and was accessible to at least 330,000 users.

The database was heavily criticised by a wide range of groups, mainly for privacy, security and child protection reasons. On 12 May 2010 the new UK Coalition Government announced plans to scrap ContactPoint and on 6 August 2010 the database was shut down. From that date the Children Act 2004 Information Database (England) Regulations 2007, as amended in 2010, no longer applies.

== Motivation ==
In April 1999, Victoria Climbié (born 2 November 1991 in Abobo, Côte d'Ivoire, died 25 February 2000 at St. Mary's Hospital, London) and her great-aunt Marie-Thérèse Kouao arrived in London, sent by her parents for a chance of an education. A few months later, Kouao met Carl Manning on a bus which he was driving, and she and Victoria moved into his flat. It was here that she was abused, including being beaten with hammers, bike chains, and wires; being forced to sleep in a bin liner in the bath; and being tied up for periods of over 24 hours. In the period leading up to her death, the police, the social services of many local authorities, the NHS, the NSPCC, and local churches all had contact with her, and noted the signs of abuse. However, in what the judge in the trial following Victoria's death described as "blinding incompetence", all failed to properly investigate the abuse and little action was taken. On 24 February 2000, Victoria was admitted into an accident-and-emergency department, semi-unconscious and suffering from hypothermia, multiple organ failure and malnutrition. She died the next day, aged eight. On 20 November 2000, her guardians, Marie Thérèse Kouao and Carl Manning, were charged with child cruelty and murder; on 12 January 2001, both were found guilty, and sentenced to life imprisonment.

Victoria's death led to a public inquiry, launched on 31 May 2001 and chaired by Herbert Laming, which investigated the role of the agencies involved in her care. The report, published on 28 January 2003, found that the agencies involved in her care failed to protect her and that on at least 12 occasions, workers involved in her case could have prevented her death. The Laming report led to, amongst other things, the creation of the Every Child Matters programme, which consists of three green papers: Every Child Matters, published in September 2003; Every Child Matters: The Next Steps, published in early 2004; and Every Child Matters: Change for Children, published in November 2004. The database proposals were announced in September 2003, alongside the publication of Every Child Matters, and was being created under Section 12 of the Children Act 2004. The idea of a child database, however, preceded the Laming report and was suggested in a report, Privacy and Data Sharing: The Way Forward for Public Services, by the Performance and Innovation Unit, published on 11 April 2002 – over a year before the Laming report – and was not related to child abuse.

== Development and closure ==
The pilot schemes (designated as identification, referral and tracking (IRT) schemes) began with Bolton council in 2003 and was used by eleven other local authorities. There were doubts as to the legality of Bolton council obtaining data of children from the local primary care trust to put on the database, but the council was eventually advised that it was legal. The other pilot areas followed, in different ways. On 8 December 2005, the Secretary of State for Education and Skills, Ruth Kelly, made the official announcement of the introduction of the database, confirmed by the Minister of State for Children, Young People and Families, Beverley Hughes.

To allow the introduction of the database, the government required all local authorities to implement the Integrated Children's System, a framework to help improve outcomes for children. The government set a deadline of 1 January 2007, and 92 out of the 150 local authorities failed to achieve this. The government began a consultation on the 2007 draft regulations on 21 September 2006 which ended on 14 December 2006. In October 2006, the government selected Capgemini to design the database. On 15 February 2007, the database was renamed from Information Sharing Index to ContactPoint, following research with stakeholder groups, including children and families, who decided that the name ContactPoint made clear what the purpose of the database was: to improve communication between those working with children. A consultation on a guide for database users was launched on 4 May 2007 and ended on 27 July 2007.

The database was expected to cost £224m to set up, spread over three years beginning December 2005 (therefore costing £81m a year for the first three years), and £41m a year thereafter. The database, which would be operating in 150 local authorities and would be accessible by at least 330,000 users, was expected to be fully operational by the end of 2008; however, following the 2007 UK child benefit data scandal, the deadline was pushed back for five months to allow a security review prior to implementation. Training for the workers had been planned begin in spring 2008.

Following the 2010 General Election the new government scrapped the database as one of their measures "to reverse the substantial erosion of civil liberties under the Labour Government and roll back state intrusion." A YouGov poll found that there was no consensus over whether this was the correct or wrong decision.

== Use ==
The government said the database was set up to improve child protection by improving the way information about children was shared between services. Only professionals whose job involves supporting children would be able to access the database, and they would be required to undergo enhanced Criminal Records Bureau checks and training. Each local authority would decide who may access the database provided their role was listed in the ContactPoint Regulations. Users would need to provide a reason for accessing a record, and an audit trail would be kept on access to the database to help detect misuse. Professionals who have completed a Common Assessment Framework, a tool used to identify the severity of a child's situation, would be able to record on a child's record that they had carried this out. No information discovered in this way would be held on ContactPoint. Under the Data Protection Act, all organisations supplying data to the database would have to inform children and guardians through fair-processing notices. Subjects of the database could make access requests, in writing, to view any personal data that organisations hold on them on the database and to correct any mistakes. The government estimated that the benefit of reducing unproductive work time using the database was valued at more than £88m.

== Content ==
The entries for a child were to consist of:

- their name, address, gender and date of birth;
- a number identifying them;
- the name and contact details of any person with parental responsibility for them (within the meaning of section 3 of the Children Act 1989) or who had care of them at any time;
- details of any education being received by them (including the name and contact details of any educational institution attended by them);
- the name and contact details of any person providing primary medical services in relation to them under Part 1 of the National Health Service Act 1977;
- the name and contact details of any person providing to them services of such description as the Secretary of State may by regulations specify;

The database would not hold case or assessment material or any subjective observations. The database could include information of a sensitive nature, defined as issues relating to sexual health, mental health and substance abuse, although consent from the child or the child's guardians would have been needed, and it would not have appeared as such on the database; it would only note that the child was receiving help from "sensitive services" and would not say what this was. Refusal of consent could be overridden if this could be justified. Margaret Hodge, then children's minister, had said that drug or alcohol use by parents, relatives and neighbours, together with other aspects of their behaviour, may be recorded. Government guidelines reveal that other information recorded may have included family routines, evidence of a disorganised or chaotic lifestyle, ways in which the family's income was used, signs of mental illness or alcohol misuse by relatives, and any serious difficulties in the parents' relationship.

In August 2006, the Department for Education and Skills (DfES) announced that the database would not include telephone numbers or addresses of celebrities' children. Records of children who may be at risk could be shielded; this would be determined on a case-by-case basis.

The technical specification for ContactPoint did not include the capacity to store biometric data.

== Coverage ==
The database would hold information on about 11 million children in England. Records would be kept until six years after the child turns 18, or if they leave England and Wales with no intention of returning. The database could also apply to 18- to 25-year-olds who were care leavers or had learning disabilities (although the United Nations Convention on the Rights of the Child only applies to those under 18 in England and Wales), and their permission was needed.

== Criticism ==
There were significant privacy concerns about the database. The Foundation for Information Policy Research produced a report in November 2006, Children’s Databases – Privacy and Safety, saying the database guidelines ignored family values and privacy, and that the details on the database needs to be "looked at carefully". The government responded by saying they had "serious reservations about [the] report's objectivity and evidence base". Terri Dowty, one of the report's authors, replied, "it's an appalling aspersion to throw at some of the leading academics in this field. I'm astonished they are challenging the evidence we used since much of the evidence in the report is from the Government itself." Action on Rights for Children said that the proposals invaded a child's right to privacy given by the Convention on the Rights of the Child, while the Joint Committee on Human Rights said that the "serious interference" with the rights under Article 8 of the European Convention on Human Rights – the right to respect for private life – seemed to be "difficult to justify". Liberty, a civil liberties interest group, said governments should not interfere with family life, warning against complacency 'about the importance of privacy in a free society'. The British Medical Association raised concerns that it may breach doctor–patient confidentiality. The phrase 'any cause for concern' was criticised as being potential overly wide-ranging and intrusive, and there were fears of function creep. A study by the Office of the Children's Commissioner, 'I think it’s about trust': The views of young people on information sharing, found that children themselves were concerned about invasions of their privacy, and that they would be reluctant to use sensitive services if this would go on the database.

Commentators expressed concern about the country's increasing surveillance. In August 2004, the information commissioner, Richard Thomas, drawing a parallel with the way that governments in Eastern Europe and Spain gained too much power and information in the 20th century, expressed concern over this and other national databases, including the Citizen Information Project, NHS National Programme for IT, and the introduction of identity cards, warning that there was a danger of the country "sleepwalk[ing] into a surveillance society". On 18 April 2006, Des Browne, the Secretary of State for Defence, said "the Department for Education and Skills should also consider whether there is scope to realise further efficiency and effectiveness benefits through a child population register", and it is thought that the database may be used in conjunction with the National Identity Register and other databases. Phil Booth, national coordinator of NO2ID, a group opposing identity cards, said this was "cradle-to-grave surveillance". Conservative Party member of parliament Oliver Heald said, "there is already public concern at government plans for a compulsory identity card database, a nanny state children's database and a property database for the council tax revaluation". Liz Davies of London Metropolitan University argued that "ContactPoint, the new database for every child in the country, is in effect a population-surveillance tool" and that "for five years, the system to prevent child abuse has been vanishing before our eyes". Fiona Nicholson of Education Otherwise, a home-education support group, agreed with this assessment and said that "frontline staff working to protect vulnerable children have also expressed disbelief that investing hundreds of millions in IT can be the best way to safeguard children". Laming, however, said that Davies' assertion was a "gross distortion of what is an intelligent application of technology aimed at ensuring every child benefits from the universal services". Privacy International awarded Hodge the 2004 Big Brother Award for "Worst Public Servant", partly due to her backing of the database.

Security concerns about the database were significant, and commentators said that there was a large risk of abuse of the system. Evidence presented in 2006 to the management board of the Leeds NHS Trust showed that in one month the 14,000 staff logged 70,000 incidents of inappropriate access. Sex offenders targeting children might have used the database to find vulnerable victims. The celebrity exclusions were attacked, with critics saying that it underlined fears about security, and that government ministers could have decided to exclude their own children from the database. The proposals might have broken data protection and human rights laws.

Some had said that the database might lead to self-fulfilling prophecies, where children from difficult backgrounds were treated as potential delinquents. The government was accused of using the public's response to the death of Victoria Climbié to force through the unpopular proposal and to curb civil liberties. There were concerns that the database would undermine child protection and parents, weakening the power of parents to look after children, and would "do more harm than good". The sheer size of the database could have meant that serious cases would be overlooked due to the abundance of minor incidents. There were doubts towards the government's estimate of the cost of the database. The information commissioner estimates it at £1bn, which Hodge said was 'absurd', and others raised concerns over the cost, noting that government projects tend to go over-budget. Some questioned children's ability to give informed consent in their own right. Mary Marsh, chief executive of the NSPCC, wanted the database to cover the whole of the United Kingdom, not just England and Wales, saying "the information held would be only partial and potentially worse than useless". On 27 June 2006, a child protection conference, "Children: Over Surveilled, Under Protected", held at the London School of Economics, reached the conclusion that the database would do nothing to prevent child abuse, and that it would undermine parents' ability to look after their children.

The government rejected most of the negative criticism. The DfES said that the database would only contain basic information and "will certainly not be including any information on children's diet or school attainment". Laming had said that information for every child needs to be kept so that they would not be at risk. The government denied any possibility of function creep. They rebutted the concerns over privacy, with a spokesman for the DfES saying "we are conscious of the need to respect personal privacy". Hodge said that the database would be secure, that it would not undermine child protection and that it would help various agencies share information. Hughes said that the database would be secure and that "we are confident we are doing all we could to ensure security". The government said that they were confident that the database complied with the Data Protection Act and the Human Rights Act. Paul Ennals, chief executive of the National Children's Bureau, said, "the index is a proportionate response to a continuing problem and any action that helps reduce the number of children who slip through the net must be welcome".

With the publication of the accreditation procedures for organisations to access ContactPoint, it became clear that the vast majority of voluntary organisations would not have been able to access ContactPoint. This meant that the majority of organisations that work with children or young people e.g. sports groups, uniformed groups and faith groups, would not be able to register their involvement, representing a real challenge for practitioners who wanted to see who was working with a particular child or young person.
