= Identity Commissioner =

Office of the Identity Commissioner logo

The Identity Commissioner (officially known as the National Identity Scheme Commissioner) was an independent regulator in the United Kingdom appointed under the Identity Cards Act 2006 based in London.

Following the formation of the Conservative – Liberal Democrat Coalition after the 2010 General Election, it was announced that the ID cards scheme was to be scrapped. The Identity Documents Act 2010 abolished ID cards and the Office of the Identity Commissioner.

== First commissioner appointed ==
The Identity Commissioner was appointed by the Home Secretary and reported at least annually to Parliament on his oversight of the National Identity Service (previously known as National Identity Scheme). The first Commissioner, Sir Joseph Pilling, took office on 1 October 2009.

== Role and powers of the Identity Commissioner ==
Under the Identity Cards Act 2006 the Identity Commissioner had the power to review matters relating to the National Identity Service including:

(i) the arrangements made by the Secretary of State for carrying out his functions under the Identity Cards Act;
(ii) the arrangements made by persons for processing information, which has been provided to them under our powers in the Act; and
(iii) the use of identity cards.

The Identity Commissioner was also obliged to review arrangements:

(i) for securing the confidentiality and integrity of the National Identity Register; and
(ii) for dealing with complaints about the way in which the Secretary of State carries out his functions relating to the Scheme.

== Annual Report 2009 ==
On 25 February 2010, as required by the 2006 Act, the Home Secretary laid before Parliament the Identity Commissioner's first annual report, outlining the work of the Commissioner since the creation of the Office of the Identity Commissioner on 1 October 2009. The report is available on the Identity Commissioner's website.
