= Joseph Pilling =

British civil servant (born 1945)

Sir Joseph Grant Pilling, KCB (born 8 July 1945) is a retired British civil servant.

Joseph Grant Pilling was born on 8 July 1945 to Fred and Eva Pilling. He was educated at Rochdale Grammar School, King's College London, and Harvard University.

Pilling served as the director-general of the Prison Service from 1991 to 1993, and then Director of Resources and Services in the Department of Health, before being appointed as Permanent Secretary of the Northern Ireland Office in 1997, where he served until 2005 when he retired. In 2009, he was appointed by the Home Secretary as the UK's first and only Identity Commissioner, a role having independent oversight of the National Identity Service government database (previously known as National Identity Scheme) and its mission of recording, cataloguing and processing the personal details of everyone in the UK. He took office on 1 October 2009.

In 2012 and 2013, Pilling chaired the House of Bishops of the Church of England Working Group on Human Sexuality. The group was commissioned by the House of Bishops in January 2012. It was composed of four bishops and was chaired by Pilling. In November 2013, the group submitted its report to the archbishops of Canterbury and York who published it. The archbishops recognised Pilling's comment that "disagreements have been explored in the warmth of a shared faith".

He is married to Ann, Lady Pilling, an author, and was appointed Knight Commander of the Order of the Bath (KCB) in the 2001 Birthday Honours, having previously been a Companion of the Order of the Bath (CB). He is a member of the Athenaeum Club.

Government offices
Preceded by Chris Train	Director-General, HM Prison Service, Home Office; 1991–1993	Succeeded by Derek Lewis
Unknown	Director of Resources and Services, Department of Health; 1993–1997	Unknown
Unknown	Permanent Secretary, Northern Ireland Office; 1997–2005	Succeeded by Sir Jonathan Phillips
New office	Identity Commissioner; 2009–2011	Office abolished
