= Point contacts =

Point contacts may refer to:

- Contact breaker, a type of electrical switch
- Point contact diode, a type of semiconductor diode
- Point of contact, a person serving as the focal point of information concerning an activity
- Point-contact transistor, the first type of solid-state electronic transistor ever constructed, in 1947
- Quantum point contact, a narrow constriction between two wide electrically conducting regions

== See also ==
- ContactPoint, a government database that held information on all children under 18 in England
- Contact Point, a small rock headland on Trinity Peninsula, Antarctica
