= CitizenCard =

Issuer of identity cards in the UK

Citizen Card is a not-for-profit business in the United Kingdom that sells Home Office-recognised photo ID/proof-of-age cards available to any resident in the UK. Cards are issued in three age groups: Under 16, 16-17 and 18+.

CitizenCard photo ID card for 18+

CitizenCard photo ID card for 16 to 17s

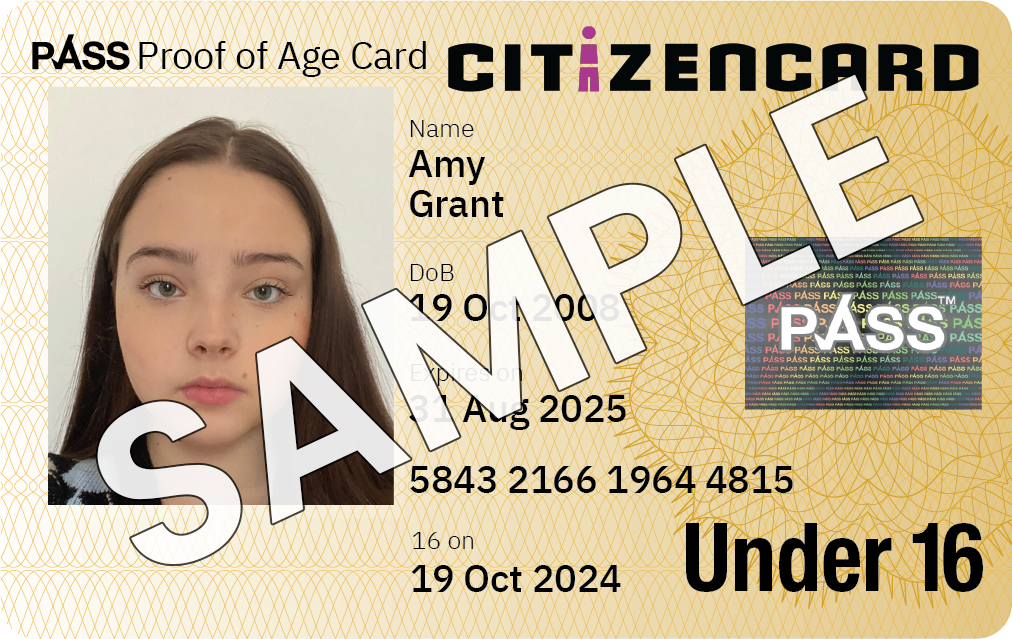
CitizenCard photo ID card for under 16

CitizenCards carry the PASS (Proof of Age Standards Scheme) hologram and logo; a scheme supported by the Home Office, the Security Industry Authority (SIA), the National Police Chiefs' Council (NPCC) and local police. In 2005 CitizenCard had issued more than two million cards.

CitizenCard runs the UK-wide 'No ID, No Sale!' campaign which provides retailers with advertising materials related to age-restricted goods.

== History ==
CitizenCard was founded in 1999 and is governed by a board of directors from the Camelot Group, The Co-operative Group, Experian, Entain, and the Tobacco Manufacturers' Association. Andrew Chevis has been the CEO since the scheme was launched.

== Distribution ==
Alongside the online application process, many cards are sold to applicants in collaboration with supermarkets, bars, newsagents, gambling shops, and local authorities through which application forms are distributed. Cards can be used to prove age when visiting age-restricted premises and when buying age-restricted goods such as alcohol and tobacco; and can be used in some parts of the UK on buses and on domestic flights.

In May 2018 CitizenCard partnered with tech start-up Yoti to offer a combined physical ID card and digital ID via Yoti's mobile app.
