= Identity Documents Act 2010 =

Act of Parliament of the United Kingdom

Identity Documents Act 2010 (Note: Section 14(5).)
- Act of Parliament
- Parliament of the United Kingdom
- Long title: An Act to make provision for and in connection with the repeal of the Identity Cards Act 2006.
- Citation: 2010 c. 40
- Introduced by: Theresa May, Home Secretary (Commons); Baroness Neville-Jones, Minister of State for Security and Counter Terrorism (Lords)
- Territorial extent: England and Wales; Scotland; Northern Ireland; (Note: Section 14(4).)

Dates
- Royal assent: 21 December 2010
- Commencement: 21 December 2010 (sections 2–3); 21 January 2011 (rest of act); (Note: Section 14(1)–(2).)
Other legislation
Amends	Football Spectators Act 1989
Repeals/revokes	Identity Cards Act 2006
Amended by	Criminal Justice Act 1993; Sentencing Act 2020
Relates to	Identity Cards Act 2006

Status: Amended

History of passage through Parliament

Text of statute as originally enacted

Revised text of statute as amended

The Identity Documents Act 2010 (c. 40) is an act of the Parliament of the United Kingdom which reversed the introduction of identity cards, and required the destruction of the information held on the National Identity Register.

As a bill, it was presented to the House of Commons by Home Secretary Theresa May on 26 May 2010, making it the first government bill to be introduced to the 55th Parliament of the United Kingdom by the Cameron ministry.

== Parliamentary passage ==
The government initially aimed to have the bill passed into law by August 2010, but the bill did not make sufficient progress to achieve this.

The bill passed the House of Commons on 15 September 2010, and was unopposed by the Opposition. It was introduced to the House of Lords on 5 October 2010, and received its second reading on 18 October 2010, and successfully passed through a Committee of the Whole House without amendment.

At report stage on 17 November 2010, however, peers accepted a Labour amendment to pay compensation to people who had already paid the charge to purchase an ID Card.

The amendment remained in place until the bill returned to the House of Commons, where it was rejected by the Speaker as it imposed an additional charge on the public purse not authorised by the Commons, which holds financial supremacy over the House of Lords. The Lords accepted the Commons disagreement to their amendment, and the bill received royal assent on 21 December 2010.

== Provisions ==
The act repealed the Identity Cards Act 2006 and required the destruction of the information held on the National Identity Register. It legislated to:

- Cancel all existing ID cards within one month of royal assent
- Remove the statutory requirement to issue ID Cards
- Cancel the National Identity Register
- Require the destruction of all data held on the register within two months of royal assent
- Close the Office of the Identity Commissioner
- Re-enact some criminal offences (possession or use of false identity documents) and certain other measures contained in the Identity Cards Act 2006

Although the act ended the validity of ID cards as travel documents, no action was taken to withdraw the National Identity Cards already issued.

== See also ==
- NO2ID
- Opinion polls on the British national identity card
