= Conservative–Liberal Democrat coalition agreement =

2010 political agreement in the United Kingdom

The Coalition: Our Programme for Government
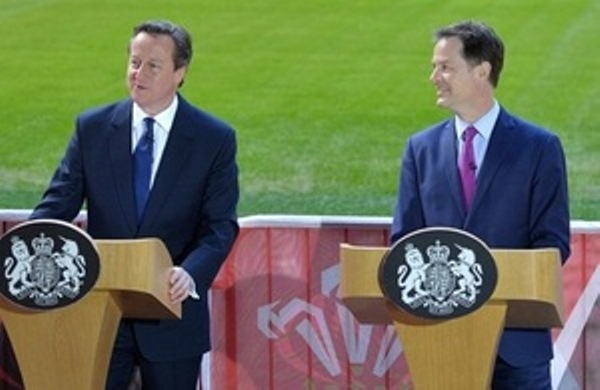
- David Cameron and Nick Clegg at the Millennium Stadium, Cardiff, on 27 February 2015.
- Type: Coalition government
- Context: Hung parliament following the 2010 general election
- Effective: 12 May 2010 (initial agreement); 20 May 2010 (final agreement)
- Expiration: 30 March 2015
- Parties: Conservative Party; Liberal Democrats

The Conservative–Liberal Democrat coalition agreement (officially known as The Coalition: Our Programme for Government) was a policy document drawn up following the 2010 general election in the United Kingdom. It formed the terms of reference governing the Cameron–Clegg coalition, the coalition government comprising MPs from the Conservative Party and the Liberal Democrats.

The general election resulted in a hung parliament, with no party emerging with an overall majority in the House of Commons, for the first time in 36 years since February 1974. As a result, the first and third parties in terms of votes and seats, the Conservatives and Liberal Democrats respectively, entered into negotiations with the aim of forming a full coalition, the first since the Second World War.

The initial agreement was published on 12 May 2010 (dated 11 May), detailing what had been agreed in the various policy areas, in order for a coalition government to be able to be formed, with a final agreement published on 20 May.

== Initial agreement ==
The initial agreement was published on 12 May 2010. It consisted of a seven-page document, in 11 sections. In the foreword, it stated "These are the issues that needed to be resolved between us in order for us to work together as a strong and stable government". Of the 57 Liberal Democrat MPs, only two refused to support the Conservative Coalition agreement, with former party leader Charles Kennedy and Manchester Withington MP John Leech both rebelling against. The 11 sections were as follows:

1. Deficit Reduction
2. Spending Review – NHS, Schools and a Fairer Society
3. Tax Measures
4. Banking Reform
5. Immigration
6. Political Reform
7. Pensions and Welfare
8. Education
9. Relationship with the EU
10. Civil liberties
11. Environment

=== Deficit ===
To tackle the budget deficit and national debt, the agreement detailed "significantly accelerated reduction in the structural deficit" over the Parliament, with £6,000,000,000 cuts to be made in the financial year 2010–11, with plans to be published in an emergency budget within fifty days.

=== Spending ===
In spending, the agreement committed the government to a full Spending Review of government including a full Strategic Security and Defence Review to be completed by the Autumn, an increase in National Health Service funding in real terms and funding of disadvantaged pupils from outside the normal education budget. It would also establish an independent commission to review the long term affordability of public sector pensions, and restore the earnings link for the basic state pension from April 2011. Britain's independent nuclear deterrent would be maintained, but the proposed replacement of the Trident system would be reviewed for value for money.

=== Tax ===
In taxation, the agreement committed to increasing the personal income tax allowance to £10,000 by 2015 to take many of those on the lowest salaries out of the tax system. The de-prioritising Inheritance Tax cuts, and also laid out measures and arrangements on the issues of marriage, aviation, non-business capital gains taxes, and tax avoidance. The planned 1% rise in National Insurance will be partially scrapped.

=== Banking ===
In the banking system, the agreement announced various reforms to "avoid a repeat of Labour's financial crisis" and stimulate the flow of credit, including the introduction of a banking levy, and controlling unacceptable bankers' bonuses and regulatory reform.

=== Immigration ===
The section regarding immigration, markedly shorter than all others, merely stated in one paragraph that there would be an annual cap on the number of non-EU workers admitted to live and work in the UK, with the mechanism decided later. The practice of child detention for immigration purposes would also be ended.

=== Political reform ===
As part of reform of the political system, the parties agreed to creating fixed-term parliaments. An early motion would set the date of the next general election as the first Thursday of May 2015, with later legislation establishing five-year fixed terms and introducing a new minimum of 55% of MPs supporting a motion before Parliament could be dissolved outside this timetable.

Both parties would ensure their MPs voted for the introduction of a Referendum Bill on the question of whether the electoral system for electing MPs to the House of Commons should change from first-past-the-post to alternative vote, and whether MPs constituencies should be changed in size or number.

On the issue of devolution, the parties agreed to establish a committee on the West Lothian question (Scottish MPs in Westminster voting on English issue), implement the Commission on Scottish Devolution proposals, and offer a referendum on further devolution for Wales.

Other political reform measures included introducing the power to recall MPs, bringing forward the Wright Committee proposals for Commons reform, and introducing proposals for reform of the House of Lords by December 2010, review local government and voter registration.

=== Pensions and welfare ===
In pensions, compulsory retirement at sixty-five years of age would be abolished, although the earliest age for the state pension would be increased from 65 to 66, from a date no earlier than 2016 for men, 2020 for women. Changes would be made to the Jobseeker's Allowance and welfare to work systems, including a rule that receipt of benefits would be conditional on willingness to work. Payments would be made to Equitable Life policy holders.

=== Education ===
A "significant" funding premium for children from poorer backgrounds will be established, incentivising schools to take them in and giving them more resources to devote to them. In schools, new providers would be allowed to enter the state schooling system where demanded, schools would be granted greater freedom over the National Curriculum, and schools would be "held properly accountable." The parties would await Lord Browne's proposals for higher education with the agreement stating the Liberal Democrats may abstain if they do not like proposed changes (i.e. if there was to be an increase in tuition fees).

=== European Union ===
As part of the agreement the parties ruled out joining the euro while the coalition was in force. The parties agreed Britain would be a "positive participant" in the European Union, although there would be "no further transfer of sovereignty or powers over the course of the next Parliament", ensured by amendment of the 1972 European Communities Act requiring referendums on future treaties, and requiring primary legislation before any Passerelle clause could be enacted, and through examination of a possible United Kingdom sovereignty bill. Other measures include non-participation in establishment of a European Public Prosecutor's Office, limiting the Working Time Directive, deciding the stance on the forthcoming EU budget, and pressuring the European Parliament to abolish its seat in Strasbourg and maintain only a single seat in Brussels.

=== Civil liberties ===
Agreement on civil liberties included measures to "reverse the substantial erosion of civil liberties under the Labour Government and roll back state intrusion." This included: the scrapping of the National Identity Card and register, the next generation biometric passport and the ContactPoint database. The Scottish model of implementation of the United Kingdom National DNA Database was to be extended to the whole of the United Kingdom. The Freedom of Information Act would be extended, and a Freedom (Great Repeal) Bill is to be introduced. Other reviews, reinforcements and repeals would take place in the fields of the right to trial by jury, the right to non-violent protest, libel laws and freedom of speech, anti-terrorism legislation, regulation of CCTV, storage of internet and email records, and creation of new criminal offences. Fingerprinting of children at school without parental permission was to be outlawed.

=== Environment ===
In pursuit of the parties' policies on creation of "a low carbon and eco-friendly economy", a range of measures would be adopted.

In transport, a high speed rail network would be established, while the proposed third runway at Heathrow Airport would be cancelled, and no new runways would be approved for Gatwick Airport or London Stansted Airport.

The legislation required for the building new nuclear power stations would proceed, without public subsidy for the projects. Any new coal-fired power stations would be required to implement carbon capture and storage, while the targets for energy from renewable sources would be increased, subject to the advice of the Climate Change Committee.

Other measures include a smart grid, smart meters and feed-in tariffs, a green investment bank would be created, and promotion of anaerobic digestion of waste for energy, marine energy, home energy improvement, green spaces and wildlife corridors, and electric car recharging networks. Home Information Packs would be abolished, albeit retaining the energy performance certificates. Import or export of illegal timber would be criminalised.

== Final agreement ==
The initial agreement published on 12 May 2010 stated that it would be followed "in due course by a final Coalition Agreement, covering the full range of policy and including foreign, defence and domestic policy issues" which were not covered in the initial agreement. David Cameron, Nick Clegg, George Osborne, Theresa May and Vince Cable held a press conference at HM Treasury to unveil the final Coalition Agreement. The final agreement is based on three core values shared by both parties "Freedom, fairness and responsibility". Of the 57 Liberal Democrat MPs, only two refused to support the Conservative Coalition agreement, with former leader Charles Kennedy and Manchester Withington MP John Leech both rebelling.

== See also ==
- Local Government Act 2010
- Postal Services Act 2011
- Savings Accounts and Health in Pregnancy Grant Act 2010
- Superannuation Act 2010
- Cameron–Clegg coalition
