= Proof of Age Standards Scheme =

Age verification scheme in the UK

- Company type: Community interest company
- Industry: Photo identification issuer accreditation
- Founded: 2001; 25 years ago in United Kingdom
- Area served: United Kingdom
- Key people: Kate Nicholls, Miles Beale, Andrew Chevis, Anna Bennett
- Website: pass-scheme.org.uk

PASS (the Proof of Age Standards Scheme) is a government-backed scheme in the United Kingdom that gives citizens a valid and accepted form of proof-of-age identification. The scheme is supported by the Home Office, the Chartered Trading Standards Institute (CTSI) and the National Police Chiefs' Council (NPCC). It acts as an umbrella system: it does not itself issue identification cards, but various proof of age card schemes operate under the PASS umbrella, and issue cards which bear a PASS hologram as proof of authenticity and validity.

== History ==
The scheme was set up in 2001 to develop a recognisable way of endorsing proof-of-age card schemes. Unlike many countries, the UK does not issue a national identity card that can be used to provide proof of age. As a result, those without a driving licence or passport had difficulty providing proof of age when purchasing age-restricted products, such as tobacco and alcohol.

In June 2014, the 18+ card designs were standardised (apart from the Young Scot card in Scotland) following feedback from police and retailers, in an effort to increase acceptance by venues, especially in the night-time economy. The only significant variation in appearance is the logo of the issuing organisation in the corner.

In November 2016, PASS was reorganised to become a community interest company and its ownership by the British Retail Consortium was ended. In January 2018, the National Police Chiefs' Council (NPCC) logo replaced the Association of Chief Police Officers' (ACPO) logo at the lower left corner of the standardised 18+ card design.

== Card suppliers ==
As of 2018 there are two types of card suppliers, national and regional. Regional cards often have requirements for residency in the area they are issued, where national cards can be obtained by anyone who can provide required information.

There are currently three councils that offer regional cards: Bracknell Forest Council (e+ card), Milton Keynes Council (All in 1 Card) and the London Borough of Southwark ("PAL").

The national suppliers are CitizenCard, Post Office Ltd, TOTUM, My ID Card, and ONEID4U. The Young Scot card is available to eligible individuals resident in Scotland.

== Acceptance ==
Proof of Age Standards Scheme's goal is to become the preferred standard in proving the age of Britons, with 5 million cards issued since 2001 and 200,000 in 2017 to 2018. Several trade bodies currently support PASS: Association of Convenience Stores, British Beer and Pub Association, British Institute of Innkeeping, UK Hospitality and the Wine and Spirits Trade Association. In addition the Home Office, the Chartered Trading Standards Institute, National Police Chiefs' Council and Security Industry Authority also support the organisation.

It is the responsibility of retailers not to supply alcohol, tobacco, and other age-restricted products to people below the legal purchasing age. Checking a proof of age card protects them against inadvertently making sales to underage people who may look older than they really are. Some places requiring proof of age will not accept some cards, despite the PASS hologram. Retailers and licensees have the right to refuse to sell a product or deny entry to an individual even if they possess a PASS endorsed card. In 2011, more than 500,000 holders of a PASS endorsed card were refused entry to pubs and clubs. As a result, in 2014 the police and Security Industry Authority, which licences doorstaff, agreed to permit their logos to be displayed on PASS cards displaying a standardised design. In 2017, HM Passport Office urged passport-holders to leave their passports at home and use a PASS card on nights out.

In 2019, PASS agreed to develop Standards for the Presentation of Digital Proof of Age with the purpose of enabling the Home Office to amend the Mandatory Licensing Conditions so that approved forms of both digital and physical proof of age could be accepted by licensees for the purpose of demonstrating due diligence.

== See also ==
- Age verification system
- British passport
- Driving licence in the United Kingdom
- Identity Cards Act 2006
- Identity card
- European identity cards
- List of age restrictions
