= Minor Ailment Scheme =

UK healthcare service

A Minor Ailment Scheme is a service provided by pharmacies for the National Health Service, first established in England in 2008.

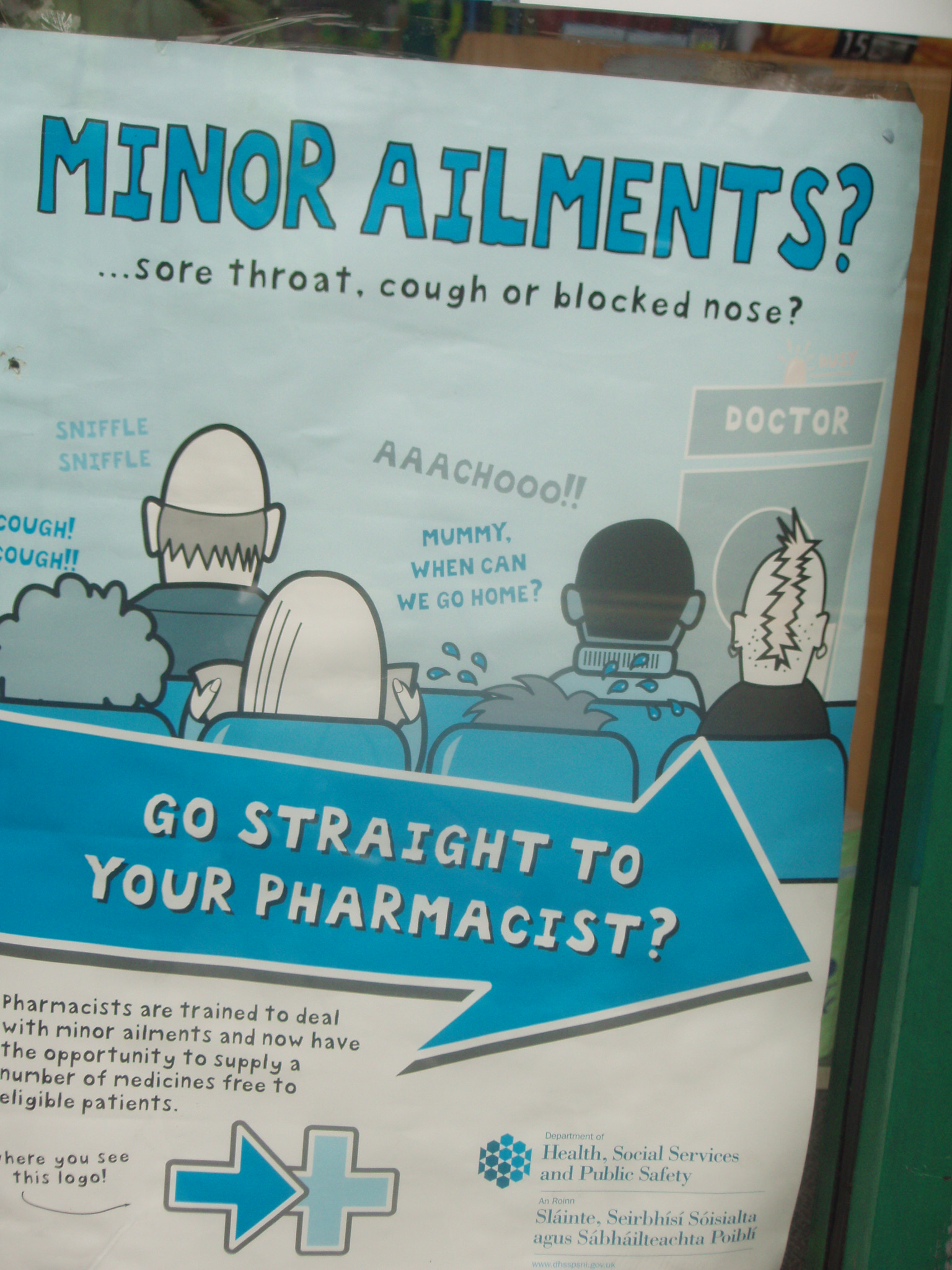
Minor Ailment Scheme poster Belfast 2007

Treatment is provided for conditions such as acute coughs, diarrhoea, earache and simple eczema in children. It is designed to enable people with minor health conditions to access medicines and advice they would otherwise visit their doctor for.

== Scotland ==
The Minor Ailment Service was introduced by NHS Scotland covering all pharmacies in 2006, but was available only to “people who meet certain age, health, and social criteria” - under-16s, under-19s in full-time education, over-60s, individuals on Jobseeker's Allowance and asylum seekers - about 60% of the Scottish population. In September 2018 it was announced that the scheme would be redesigned and extended to the whole population. Almost 90% of patients surveyed on their use of the scheme said their consultation experience was “excellent”. 29% of consultations were for treatment of an allergy, 16% for skin conditions, 11% for gastrointestinal issues, 10% for infections, 8% for respiratory problems and 7% for musculoskeletal pain.

The scheme is to be replaced by the NHS Pharmacy First scheme in July 2020.

== Northern Ireland ==
In Northern Ireland, the scheme cost £6,366,089 for medicines supplied, and £7,830,424 for fees paid to community pharmacies providing the service from 2013 to 2017. The largest amount, £1,201,495, was spent on Hedrin lotion for the treatment of head lice.

== England ==
In England, these services were commissioned by individual Clinical Commissioning Groups. Schemes varied. Prescriptions are only provided free of charge if the patient is exempt from paying prescription charges. The Derbyshire Joint Area Prescribing Committee announced in June 2018 that it was decommissioning its scheme, called Pharmacy First, on which they had spent £3 million in 2015/2016, much of it on over-the-counter medicines, which do not need a prescription, and which came within the scope of NHS England's blacklist. In the same month Dudley CCG established a new Pharmacy First with 43 participating pharmacies. 23 schemes in England were decommissioned between 2015 and 2018 and a scheme covering 14 London boroughs will shut in March 2019 leaving schemes operating in only 43% of areas. The median annual spend per scheme is £86,837. A new scheme exclusively for people who are “socially vulnerable” is being planned for London, but it is not yet clear who will be eligible.

== Ireland ==
The Irish Pharmacy Union is campaigning in 2022 for a Community Pharmacy-based Triage Programme which would include a Minor Ailment Scheme, use of Emergency Medicines, and Minor Injuries.
