= Citizen Information Project =

British population register project

In the United Kingdom, the Citizen Information Project (CIP) was a plan by the Office for National Statistics to build a national population register.

On 18 April 2006 it was announced that instead of continuing as a separate project, it would be integrated into the National Identity Register, the database behind the proposed national identity cards. It has been estimated that this might add £200 million to the cost of the identity cards. The National Identity Register was destroyed as the Identity Cards Act 2006 was repealed in 2011.

== Scope and purpose ==
The register was to have been used as a single reference point for government contact, for the exchange of personal contact data, and for the collection of statistics, so reducing duplication in government departments and agencies. Government databases would have been linked together using National Insurance or other personal numbers.

In late 2003 the project moved into a definition phase. It was hoped that the CIP would be able to use data from the proposed National Identity Register.

A report on preliminary testing was due in April 2005, and it had been expected that it would have been implemented before the end of 2007 if approval had been given by Government. Initial estimates in 2004 suggested that the costs might have been £1.2 - £2.4 billion (240 million annually for a period of 5 to 10 years).
