= Young Scot Awards =

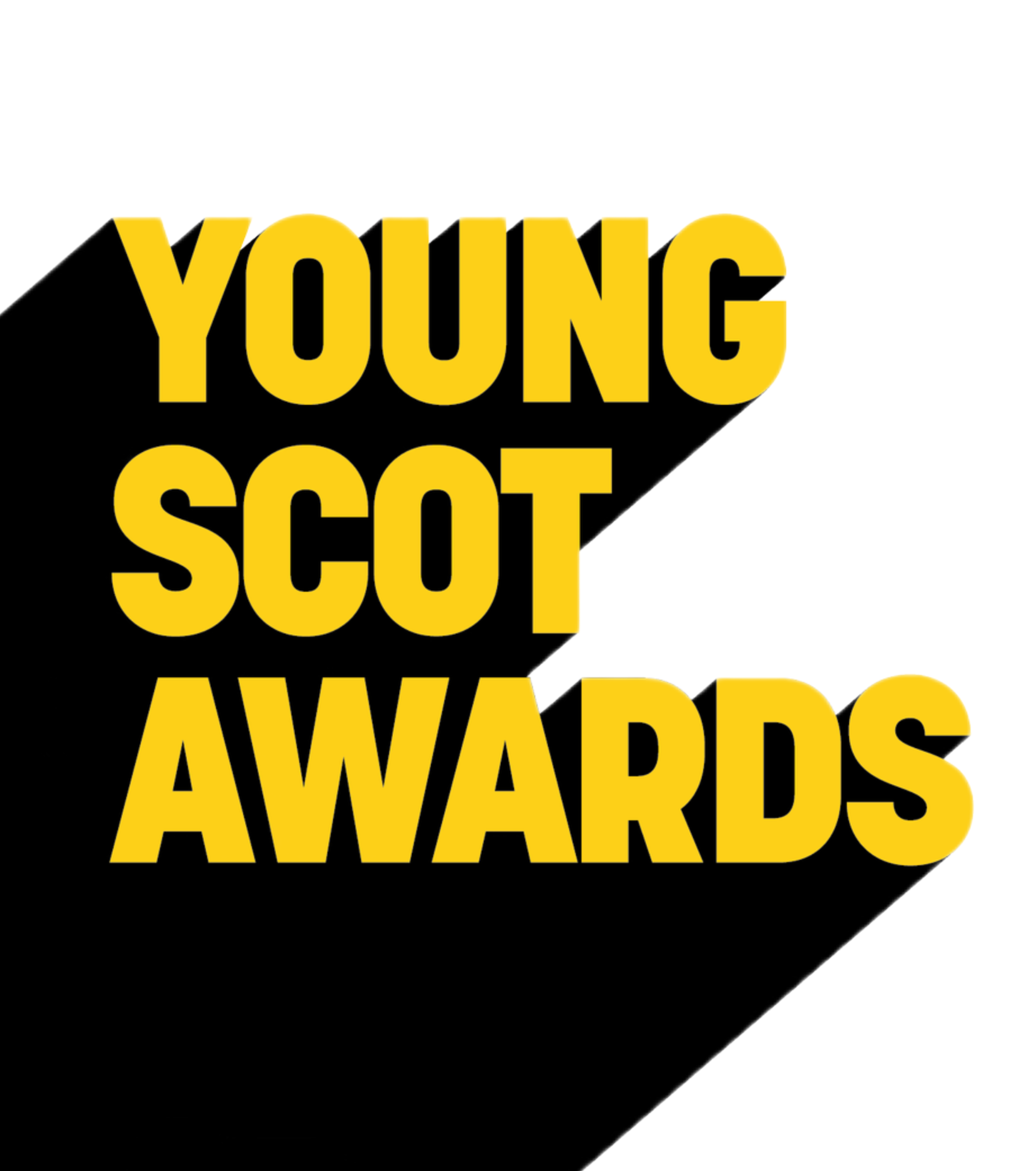
- Awarded for: Excellence in community work or personal achievements
- Country: Scotland
- First award: 2006; 20 years ago
- Website: young.scot/awards

The Young Scot Awards is an annual award ceremony hosted by Young Scot to honour young people in Scotland for considerable achievements and positive contributions to charity or their community. Sunday Mail and Young Scot partnered to deliver the event until 2023.

The first ceremony was held in 2006, and was hosted by Andrea McLean. Between 2015 and 2017, the awards were hosted by Edith Bowman. In 2018, the event was hosted by Iain Stirling at the SEC Armadillo in Glasgow. No event was held in 2019 and the 2020 event was hosted by Gemma Cairney online due to the COVID-19 pandemic. Capital FM Scotland DJ Katy J hosted the 2023 event at Platform in Glasgow.

== Annual ceremony ==
The ceremony is annually attended by celebrities and prominent politicians, who will present awards or perform. Guests at past ceremonies have included Nicola Sturgeon, Alesha Dixon, Olly Murs, Shayne Ward, Jack McConnell, Elaine C. Smith, Ashley and Pudsey, Conor Maynard, Stevie McCrorie, Ross Murdoch, the cast from River City and Nicholas McDonald.

== Awards categories ==
- Equality & Diversity
- Sport & Physical Activity (sponsored by sportscotland)
- Health & Wellbeing
- Community
- Environment
- Entertainment & Culture

== Notable winners and finalists ==
Past Young Scot Awards winners include Amy Macdonald, Karen Gillan, Andy Murray, Paolo Nutini, Martin Compston, Nina Nesbitt, Lewis MacDougall, Paul Brannigan, Laura Muir, Iona Fyfe and Jordan Daly.

== Events and venues ==
| Year | Presenter(s) | Host city | Venue |
|---|---|---|---|
| 2006 | Andrea McLean | Glasgow | Old Fruitmarket |
| 2007 | Unknown | Glasgow | Old Fruitmarket |
| 2008 | Unknown | Glasgow | Old Fruitmarket |
| 2009 | Jenni Falconer | Glasgow | Old Fruitmarket |
| 2010 | Unknown | Glasgow | Hilton Hotel Glasgow |
| 2011 | Olly Murs | Glasgow | Hilton Hotel Glasgow |
| 2012 | Sean Betty | Glasgow | Hilton Hotel Glasgow |
| 2013 | Alesha Dixon | Glasgow | SEC Armadillo |
| 2014 | Romeo | Glasgow | SEC Armadillo |
| 2015 | Edith Bowman | Edinburgh | Usher Hall |
| 2016 | Edith Bowman | Edinburgh | Edinburgh International Conference Centre |
| 2017 | Edith Bowman | Glasgow | SEC Armadillo |
| 2018 | Iain Stirling | Glasgow | SEC Armadillo |
| 2019 | No event held | | |
| 2020 | Gemma Cairney | Online | |
| 2021 | Jean Johansson | Online | |
| 2022 | Gemma Cairney | Edinburgh | Edinburgh International Conference Centre |
| 2023 | Katy J | Glasgow | Platform Glasgow (formerly The Arches, Glasgow) |
| 2024 | No event held | | |
| 2025 | Katy J | Glasgow | Platform Glasgow (formerly The Arches, Glasgow) |
