= Young Scot =

Scottish national youth charity

- Young Scot's logo
- Formation: 1981
- Founder: Marcus Liddle OBE
- Type: Charity
- Purpose: To support young people to thrive and make the most of their lives as they grow up.
- Location: Scotland
- Fields: Youth information Active citizenship Volunteering & surveys Discounts; Young Scot National Entitlement Card; Young Scot Awards
- Chief Executive: Kirsten Urquhart BEM
- Board of directors: Elma Murray OBE, Chair
- Website: young.scot youngscot.net

Young Scot (Gaelic: Òigridh na h-Alba) is a national youth information and citizenship charity for 11 to 25 year olds living in Scotland.

== Information for young people ==
Young Scot is the national youth information charity in Scotland. Their website has quality-assured information for young people. Information is published in both English and Gaelic. Young Scot works with partners and experts to develop information on important issues for young people.

They also hold the European Youth Information and Counselling Agency's European Quality Label for youth information. This certifies the quality-assurance processes in place when creating information.

Young Scot is also the Scottish member for the European Youth Information and Counselling Agency – part of a network of 42 national and regional youth information coordinating bodies from 26 countries across Europe. Their declared mission is to build a society where young people have access to youth-friendly, reliable and comprehensive information that promotes their autonomy and well-being, while encouraging their active participation in society.

== Volunteering and survey opportunities for young people ==
Young Scot offers young people opportunities to take part in surveys or volunteering. Volunteering opportunities have been offered in partnership with Scottish Government divisions and public bodies, including Nature Scot, BBC Scotland, Scottish Qualifications Authority, Co-op Foundation, Carnegie UK Trust, Glasgow City of Science & Innovation and 5Rights Foundation.

Young people can also use their Young Scot National Entitlement Card number for participatory budgeting and e-voting in their local communities.

== Young Scot National Entitlement Card ==
Young people in Scotland get a free Young Scot National Entitlement Card. They can use their card for discounts at local and national outlets in Scotland and across Europe. Young people can also use their cards for discounted public transport and other local services. The card is also part of the Scottish National Entitlement Card programme that runs in Scotland.

It is also a proof of age card accredited by the Proof of Age Standards Scheme (PASS) scheme which applies across the United Kingdom.

Young Scot is the only Scottish member of the European Youth Card Association. The European Youth Card offers discounts on travel, culture, accommodation, education, services and products in 36 countries across Europe. Six million young people are eligible for a card.

Young Scot also has a Young Scot Rewards scheme where users can earn reward points and then in turn collect rewards. The programme encourages young people to be active citizens by rewarding them for taking part in positive activities. Young carers are also eligible for support too.

== Young Persons’ (Under 22s) Free Bus Travel ==
Young people aged 5–21 years old can apply to access the Young Persons’ (Under 22s) Free Bus Travel Scheme, which began on 31 January 2022. The scheme is run by Transport Scotland. Young people need a Scottish National Entitlement Card or Young Scot National Entitlement Card with the valid free travel entitlement to take the bus for free.

The Young Persons’ (Under 22s) Free Bus Travel scheme lets young people travel for free on any bus in any part of Scotland on registered bus services. Only a few services, such as premium-fare night buses and City Sightseeing buses, are not included.

== Young Scot Awards ==
The Young Scot Awards or #YSAwards is an awards ceremony hosted by Young Scot to honour young people in Scotland for considerable achievements and positive contributions to charity or their community.

The first ceremony was held in 2006, and was hosted by Andrea McLean. Between 2015 and 2017, the awards were hosted by Edith Bowman. In 2018, the event was hosted by Iain Stirling at the SEC Armadillo in Glasgow. No event was held in 2019 and the 2020 event was hosted by Gemma Cairney online due to the COVID-19 pandemic. Capital FM Scotland DJ Katy J hosted the 2023 event at Platform in Glasgow.

=== Annual ceremony ===
The ceremony is annually attended by celebrities and prominent politicians, who will present awards or perform. Guests at past ceremonies have included Humza Yousaf, Nicola Sturgeon, Alesha Dixon, Olly Murs, Shayne Ward, Jack McConnell, Elaine C.Smith, Conor Maynard, Stevie McCrorie, Ross Murdoch, the cast from River City and Nicholas McDonald.

=== Young Scot Awards categories ===
Equality & Diversity	Sport & Physical Activity (sponsored by sportscotland)
Health & Wellbeing	Community
Environment	Entertainment & Culture

=== Notable winners and finalists ===
Past Young Scot Awards winners include Amy Macdonald, Karen Gillan, Andy Murray, Paolo Nutini, Martin Compston, Nina Nesbitt, Lewis MacDougall, Paul Brannigan, Laura Muir, Iona Fyfe, Ncuti Gatwa and Jamie Genevieve.

=== Events and venues ===
Year	Presenter(s)	Host city	Venue
2006	Andrea McLean	Glasgow	Old Fruitmarket
2007	Unknown	Glasgow	Old Fruitmarket
2008	Unknown	Glasgow	Old Fruitmarket
2009	Jenni Falconer	Glasgow	Old Fruitmarket
2010	Unknown	Glasgow	Hilton Hotel Glasgow
2011	Olly Murs	Glasgow	Hilton Hotel Glasgow
2012	Seán Batty	Glasgow	Hilton Hotel Glasgow
2013	Alesha Dixon	Glasgow	SEC Armadillo
2014	Romeo	Glasgow	SEC Armadillo
2015	Edith Bowman	Edinburgh	Usher Hall
2016	Edith Bowman	Edinburgh	Edinburgh International Conference Centre
2017	Edith Bowman	Glasgow	SEC Armadillo
2018	Iain Stirling	Glasgow	SEC Armadillo
2019	No event held		
2020	Gemma Cairney	Online	
2021	Jean Johansson	Online	
2022	Gemma Cairney	Edinburgh	Edinburgh International Conference Centre
2023	Katy J	Glasgow	Platform Glasgow (formerly The Arches, Glasgow)
2025	Katy J	Glasgow	Platform Glasgow (formerly The Arches, Glasgow)

== See also ==
- Scottish National Entitlement Card
