= UK Digital ID =

Proposed digital ID for UK residents

A proposed digital ID scheme (also known as "BritCard" or "Brit Card") for adult residents of the United Kingdom was announced by prime minister Keir Starmer on 25 September 2025. The Starmer government stated that introducing it was part of their plan to tackle the rise in illegal migrant crossings in small boats across the English Channel, and that it was to be mandatory to prove the right to work.

The proposals for digital ID received opposition from Labour MPs and other political leaders due to concerns around the possible infringement of civil liberties, with Big Brother Watch describing the plans as "wholly unBritish" and creating a "domestic mass surveillance infrastructure". It has been compared to the abandoned voluntary ID card scheme of former prime minister Tony Blair. A petition against mandatory digital ID cards had 2.9 million signatures as of 23 October 2025.

The government backed down on the card being compulsory in January 2026, stating that other forms of identification would also be acceptable to prove the right to work. In July 2026, incoming Prime Minister Andy Burnham pledged to scrap the scheme to focus on other priorities.

== Background ==
A previous national ID card scheme had been passed in 2006 by the Labour government, but repealed by the Conservative/Liberal Democrat Coalition in 2011. In 2024, home secretary Yvette Cooper said that ID cards were not in the manifesto and not their approach, in response to Tony Blair's calls for digital ID, which he promoted as a method to tackle immigration, although he admitted the idea was 'scary'. Blair's Tony Blair Institute for Global Change continued to call for digital ID in 2025, with Blair arguing that British people would sacrifice privacy for efficiency. In April 2025, an open letter signed by over 40 Labour MPs called for ministers to introduce digital IDs. In September, the Tony Blair Institute proposed a 'super ID card' to consolidate public interactions with the government into one place, such as for reporting potholes and applying for benefits.

== Implementation ==
Prime Minister Keir Starmer announced the digital ID scheme, also temporarily dubbed the "BritCard", on 25 September 2025 for all residents of the United Kingdom. The Starmer ministry planned to introduce the ID scheme by the end of the parliamentary term in 2029 as part of its attempts to tackle illegal migrant crossings in small boats across the English Channel. After the announcement, the work and pensions secretary Pat McFadden identified the Estonian identity card as a model for the scheme and said that British forms of identity had not kept apace with technological developments. The ID would be mandatory for right to work checks in the UK, however the government stated people would not be required to carry it, or asked to produce it. Chief Secretary to the Prime Minister Darren Jones suggested digital ID could have much wider uses in the future.

== Reception ==
Many Labour MPs opposed the policy because of concerns around the possible infringement of civil liberties. Conservative leader Kemi Badenoch stated her party would oppose mandatory ID cards. Former Labour leader Jeremy Corbyn called it an 'affront to our civil liberties'. Reform UK leader Nigel Farage has stated he is 'firmly opposed' to the proposal, and that it 'will make no difference to illegal migration'. Liberal Democrat leader Ed Davey said his party would fight the policy "tooth and nail", comparing it to the abandoned mandatory ID card scheme of former Labour prime minister Tony Blair. A UK Parliament petitions website petition against mandatory digital ID cards has reached over 2.9 million signatures as of 23 October 2025, making it one of the largest in parliamentary history. The UK government responded on 2 October 2025, saying “We will introduce a digital ID within this Parliament to help tackle illegal migration, make accessing government services easier, and enable wider efficiencies. We will consult on details soon.”

Big Brother Watch has described the plans for mandatory digital ID as "wholly unBritish" and creating a "domestic mass surveillance infrastructure", and that they would be "uniquely harmful to privacy, equality, and civil liberties". Critics have also claimed that it is unlikely to stop small boat crossings, as well as the risk of cyber attacks and incentive to allow the data to be used to train AI models.

Nationalist leaders in Scotland and all five of Northern Ireland's main parties have criticised the scheme due to both concerns around civil liberties and also the potential for the ID scheme to force citizens to declare themselves as British. In September 2025, Scottish National Party (SNP) first minister John Swinney and Northern Irish Sinn Féin first minister Michelle O'Neill declared their opposition to the ID scheme. Swinney said "people should go about their daily lives without such infringements" and said the ID scheme appeared like an attempt to "force every Scot to declare ourselves British. I am a Scot." O'Neill called the proposal an "an attack on the rights of Irish citizens" and the Good Friday Agreement, which allows citizens of Northern Ireland to legally identify as either British, Irish or both. In response, the UK Government said the ID scheme would respect the agreement. Northern Irish unionist parties also joined in their opposition to the policy, with Democratic Unionist Party leader Gavin Robinson describing it as "yet another layer of bureaucracy for ordinary citizens" which will do "very little to stop illegal immigration" and a spokesman of the Ulster Unionist Party calling it "an excessive and ill-conceived initiative that compromises the fundamental right to privacy for law-abiding citizens".

Green MP Siân Berry led a motion calling on the government to scrap its digital ID plans, with the motion being backed by MPs from multiple parties. An open letter by independent MP Rupert Lowe expressing "profound and passionate opposition" to the plans was signed by more than 30 MPs, from multiple parties.

== Climbdown ==
The government backed down on the card being compulsory in January 2026, stating that other forms of identification would also be acceptable to prove the right to work. Representatives of other political parties expressed their satisfaction about the government U-turn. Starmer's successor, Andy Burnham, has stated that he plans to scrap the Digital ID scheme to reallocate resources to cost-of-living measures.
