= NO2ID =

British campaign group

- Formation: 2004
- Type: Advocacy group
- Legal status: Company limited by guarantee
- Purpose: Civil and political rights Data privacy
- Region served: United Kingdom
- Website: www.no2id.uk

NO2ID is a non-partisan public campaign group in the United Kingdom, formed in 2004 to campaign against the UK government's plans to introduce British national identity cards linked to a centralised computer database, the National Identity Register (NIR). NO2ID claims the growth of government data-sharing initiatives has brought the UK to the "verge of a surveillance state in which every action of the citizen is potentially subject to monitoring". The NIR and ID cards were abolished by the Identity Documents Act 2010, (Note: Digital ID cards were proposed by the prime minister Keir Starmer in 2025; these were made non-compulsory in 2026. Many opponents of the compulsory digital ID card scheme had previously been involved with the NO2ID campaign.) leading NO2ID to focus on other campaigns surrounding government infringement on civil liberties and data privacy.

== History ==
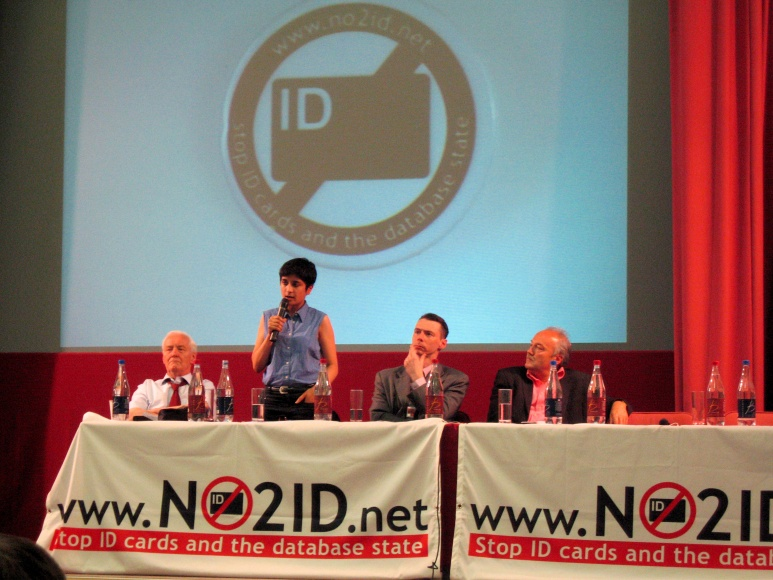
Meeting in London against ID cards, 2005. Left to right, the speakers are Tony Benn, Shami Chakrabarti, Mark Littlewood and George Galloway.

NO2ID arose initially from various campaigning groups to become an entity in its own right. Its initial form was to act as an umbrella group including staff and officers of Liberty, Charter 88 (now Unlock Democracy), Privacy International, the Foundation for Information Policy Research, the 1990 Trust and Stand.org.uk. NO2ID-branded material first appeared in 2002, published and paid for by Liberty and Charter 88.

NO2ID's support is broad based including political parties on the political left (such as Respect and the Greens), in the centre (such as the Liberal Democrats) and on the right (such as the United Kingdom Independence Party and Conservative Future, though the Conservative Party has pledged to scrap the ID scheme). In addition, civil liberties groups such as Liberty, Privacy International, Action on Rights for Children, the Open Rights Group and Genewatch UK, other organisations including trades unions (e.g. UNISON, the National Union of Journalists & the University and College Union) and public bodies including District, City and Borough Councils, the Scottish Parliament, the National Assembly for Wales and the London Assembly and individuals such as Neil Tennant, Philip Pullman, and Conservative Mayor of London Boris Johnson have affiliated to or made public declarations of support for the NO2ID campaign.

== Organisation ==
NO2ID is a UK-wide membership organisation, supported by subscriptions, donations and some grant funding, mainly from the Joseph Rowntree Reform Trust Ltd. It has established and supports national and regional groups across the UK, one of the first being NO2ID Scotland, as well as a network of action-oriented local groups staffed entirely by volunteers.

Mark Littlewood, on sabbatical from Liberty, became its chief spokesman and chairman.

NO2ID grew rapidly during the initial Parliamentary battle against the UK ID cards legislation which, after the first Bill fell having failed to be passed before the general election in May 2005, was re-introduced and passed as the Identity Cards Act 2006 in March 2006. At that point, NO2ID had around 30,000 registered supporters and a network of around 100 other supportive organisations. A partial list of those organisations declaring public support can be found on the NO2ID website.

As of December 2008, NO2ID had some 60,000 registered supporters and active groups in most major cities and many towns across the UK.

NO2ID became a Company limited by guarantee on 5 May 2009.

NO2ID's original website became inactive in May 2024.

== Campaign ==
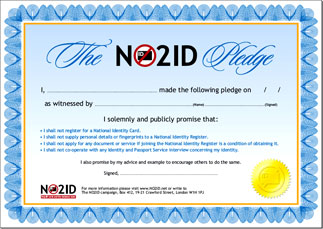
NO2ID Pledge certificate

NO2ID launched its public campaign with an online petition that gathered over 3,000 signatures in a little over four weeks, submitted just as the Labour Government introduced the first Identity Cards Bill in November 2004.

In July 2005, NO2ID signed up over 10,000 people through PledgeBank, who pledged to refuse to accept an identity card and to contribute £10 to a fund to provide legal support for those prosecuted for resisting registration. A second identical pledge was launched to try to double the number of people publicly committed to resisting registration, but this failed to gain traction. Over two years later, in November 2007, the Pledge was called in and during the first fortnight alone over £40,000 was raised and put into a ring-fenced Legal Defence Fund.

In May 2006, NO2ID launched the "Renew for Freedom" campaign, urging passport holders to renew their passports to delay being entered on the National Identity Register. This followed a comment made by Charles Clarke in the House of Commons that "anyone who feels strongly enough about the linkage [between passports and the ID scheme] not to want to be issued with an ID card in the initial phase will be free to surrender their existing passport and apply for a new passport before the designation order takes effect". UK Passport Office statistics published the following year suggest that between 30,000 and 40,000 people renewed their passport in the first month of the campaign.

In September 2006, the NO2ID campaign started an appeal to track down the locations of the new outsourced Passport / National Identity Register "personal interview" registration centres at which the government planned to start face to face identity interviews. The project, named 'Authentication by Interview' (AbI), due to launch in October 2006, suffered a series of delays during which the campaign located 67 of the 69 interview centres – often revealing their location before Home Office ministers were able to do so in Parliamentary Answers.

In November 2007, the campaign launched the NO2ID Pledge – a new form of non-violent direct action: pre-emptive resistance. The NO2ID Pledge, supported by public figures including Nick Clegg and Shirley Williams, encourages people to resolve publicly and clearly that they will not to do those specific things that give the ID scheme its "parasitic vitality".

== Repeal of the Identity Cards Act ==
In September 2010, the Identity Documents Act 2010 was passed, repealing the Identity Cards Act 2006 and abolishing identity cards and the National Identity Register. At the introduction of the Bill by the Conservative Party and Liberal Democrats coalition government in June 2010, former Home Secretary David Blunkett under whom the ID scheme began, acknowledged the success of the campaign: "I need to be contrite enough to congratulate Phil Booth from NO2ID, Dr Whitley from the London School of Economics identity project, and others, for the tremendous campaign that they have run, over the past five years in particular, to stop this scheme." At third reading of the Bill in the House of Commons in September 2010, Home Office minister Damian Green acknowledged NO2ID's part in the abolition of the ID scheme, saying: "I also pay tribute to the NO2ID campaign, which can chalk itself up as one of the most successful pressure groups in history. It was formed less than 10 years ago, and within a decade of its formation it has achieved its principal aim."

== Related campaigns ==
During the course of its campaign against the database state, NO2ID has helped establish three other independent campaigns: The Big Opt Out and medConfidential campaigning for medical confidentiality and LeaveThemKidsAlone, a parent-led campaign against the fingerprinting of children in schools and nurseries.

== See also ==
- Document imaging#Identity document scanning
- NHS Connecting for Health
- Online Safety Act 2023
- Pressure groups in the United Kingdom
- UK Internet age verification system
- Voter identification in the United Kingdom
