= Healthcare in Derbyshire =

Healthcare in Derbyshire was the responsibility of five clinical commissioning groups covering North Derbyshire, Southern Derbyshire, Erewash, Hardwick, and Tameside and Glossop. North Derbyshire, Southern Derbyshire, Erewash and Hardwick announced in November 2018 that they planned to merge. As 1st of April 2019, they have officially merged, with the new NHS Derby and Derbyshire CCG bringing together 116 local GP practices to care for over a million patients in the region.

== History ==
From 1947 to 1974 NHS services in Derbyshire (apart from those for Glossop and Buxton) were managed by the Sheffield Regional Hospital Board. In 1974 the boards were abolished and replaced by regional health authorities. Derbyshire came under the Trent RHA. Regions were reorganised in 1996 and Derbyshire came under the West Midlands Regional Health Authority. From 1974 there was an area health authority covering the county. From 1982 there were two district health authorities, North and South. Eight primary care trusts were established in the county in 2002: Central Derby, Greater Derby, High Peak and Dales, Erewash, Derbyshire Dales and South Derbyshire, North Eastern Derbyshire, Amber Valley and Chesterfield. They were merged into two: Derby City and Derbyshire County in 2006. They were managed by the Trent Strategic Health Authority which was merged into NHS East Midlands in 2006.

NHS Erewash, Hardwick, North Derbyshire and Southern Derbyshire CCGs merged on 1st of April 2019 to become NHS Derby and Derbyshire CCG.

== Sustainability and transformation plan ==
In March 2016 Gary Thompson, the Chief Officer of Southern Derbyshire Clinical Commissioning Group was appointed the leader of the Derbyshire Sustainability and transformation plan footprint which covers the whole county apart from Glossop. The plan envisages bed reductions: 400 in the acute sector, 85 in community hospitals and 50 mental health beds. Some community hospitals will be closed. Burton Hospital A&E was likely to be downgraded as part of the STP for Staffordshire. This would affect much of the south of the county.

A contract for a shared care record across the county was set up in 2021 with Orion Health for the Integrated Care System.

== Commissioning ==
Glossop has always been included in Greater Manchester for purposes of healthcare commissioning. Services for that area are commissioned by NHS Tameside and Glossop Clinical Commissioning Group. The four other CCGs announced that they planned to have a single shared chief officer, and would move to a ”single strategic commissioning organisation” in May 2017. In November 2017 all four decided to stop prescriptions for gluten-free food in a bid to save £650,000 per year, despite guidance which said they should offer prescriptions for gluten-free bread and flour.

== Primary care ==
There were 36 practices in North Derbyshire CCG in 2016.

Out-of-hours services are provided in the county by Derbyshire Health United. A proposal by Southern Derbyshire Clinical Commissioning Group to establish just one hub for extended hours access in their area for pre-bookable appointments after 6.30pm on weekdays and on Saturday and Sunday, was abandoned after the Derbyshire local medical committee complained that this was inappropriate in a rural area. It was later planned to establish four hubs.

The Derbyshire Joint Area Prescribing Committee announced in June 2018 that it was decommissioning its scheme, called Pharmacy First, on which they had spent £3 million in 2015/2016, much of it on over-the-counter medicines, which do not need a prescription, and which came within the scope of NHS England's blacklist.

== Acute services ==
University Hospitals of Derby and Burton NHS Foundation Trust and Chesterfield Royal Hospital NHS Foundation Trust are located in the county. Services for Glossop and Buxton are largely provided by Manchester hospitals.

== Mental health and community services ==
Derbyshire Healthcare NHS Foundation Trust and Pennine Care NHS Foundation Trust are the main providers of mental health care in the county. Derbyshire Community Health Services NHS Foundation Trust announced plans to merge with Derbyshire Healthcare NHS Foundation Trust in November 2016.

Cavendish Hospital in Buxton is partly run by Stockport NHS Foundation Trust. There are 16 community hospital beds and ten older people's mental health beds.
