= NHS number =

Identification number for NHS users

NHS numbers are the unique numbers allocated in a shared numbering scheme to registered users of the three public health services in England, Wales and the Isle of Man. It is the key to the identification of patients, especially in delivering safe care across provider organisations, and is required in all new software deployed within these National Health Services (NHS).

== History ==
"New NHS numbers" were allocated to every newborn from July 1995, generally introduced in 1996, and became mandatory on 1 April 1997. This replaced the previous system founded on wartime identity card numbers, which in England and Wales used letters and digits (e.g. JRDAN 269); Scotland used numbers based on households with individuals further identified within the household (e.g. STUV123:3), and this meant that it was hard to validate a specific number. The numerical part of ID/NHS numbers allocated to people born after the Second World War in England and Wales matched the birth register entry number (i.e. a person whose birth was entry number xy would have an ID/NHS number in the format LLLLxy). Between 1969 and July 1995, the old-style NHS number was used on a baby's birth certificate as the reference number for the certificate.

== Issue ==
A person gets an NHS number at birth or when they first make contact with the NHS by registering with a GP. It comes from a record being made on the Personal Demographics Service, a national patient database. NHS Numbers are re-issued if a patient is adopted or undergoes gender re-assignment.

== Format, number ranges, and check characters ==
The current system uses a ten-digit number in '3 3 4' format with the final digit being an error-detecting checksum. Examples given include 987 654 4321.

Currently issued numbers for England, Wales and the Isle of Man are from 400 000 000 to 499 999 999, and 600 000 000 to 799 999 999. Current numbers in England also include 3xx xxx xxxx. Unavailable number ranges include 320 000 001 to 399 999 999 (allocated to the Northern Irish system) and 010 100 0000 to 311 299 9999 (used for CHI numbers in Scotland). NHS England reserves the numbers 999 000 0000 to 999 999 9999 for test purposes; these numbers are valid but are never going to be issued.

The checksum is calculated by multiplying each of the first nine digits by 11 minus its position. Using the number 943 476 5919 as an example:

- The first digit is 9. This is multiplied by 10.
- The second digit is 4. This is multiplied by 9.
- And so on until the ninth digit (1) is multiplied by 2.
- The result of this calculation is summed. In this example: (9×10) + (4×9) + (3×8) + (4×7) + (7×6) + (6×5) + (5×4) + (9×3) + (1×2) = 299.
- The remainder when dividing this number by 11 is calculated, yielding a number in the range 0–10, which would be 2 in this case.
- Finally, this number is subtracted from 11 to give the checksum in the range 1–11, in this case 9, which becomes the last digit of the NHS number.
- A checksum of 11 is represented by 0 in the final NHS number. If the checksum is 10 then the number is not valid.

== Coordination with Scotland and Northern Ireland ==
Scotland's equivalent is called a CHI number. A similar system is used in Northern Ireland. The three systems use the same format but with non-overlapping number blocks, as above, preventing the issue of the same number by more than one system.

== See also ==
- NHS Connecting for Health
- National Insurance number
