= European Youth Card =

The European Youth Card (also known as EURO<26) allows reductions on cultural activities, shops, transport, eating out, and accommodation, and can be used in 38 European countries. Most countries make it possible to buy and use the card up to the age of 30. The card is usually issued for one year.

In January 2022 the Council of Europe and the European Youth Card Association (EYCA) signed a Grant Agreement aimed at supporting the European Youth Card. The focus for 2022 was to be how the card can support opportunities for disadvantaged young people and contribute to the European youth work agenda.

In many European countries, the card is still known as EURO<26, but with the change of the age limit (from 26 to 30), it is called the European Youth Card (in English or the local language: Jugendkarte, Carta Giovani, Carnet Joven).

The European Youth Card comes in three versions: classic, student, and co-brand. The co-branded card can be issued with various partners - a bank, a railway company, a municipality or a local government, a cultural institution, or another. The design of the co-branded card can be very different from the classic card, however, it always carries the EYCA logo and offers the same benefits as the classic card.

European Youth Card is managed by the non-profit European Youth Card Association (EYCA) which represents 40 Youth Card organizations in 38 countries. All EYCA Member organizations issue the European Youth Card in their territory and develop local discounts individually. The offices of the EYCA are in Brussels, Belgium, and Bratislava, Slovakia.

The European Youth Card can be purchased through the national card organization. Young people coming from outside Europe, or living in a country where there is no national card organization, have the opportunity to buy the card online through the Kiosk shop managed by the EYCA headquarters.

Cardholders can search all the 80,000 discounts on the online geo-tagged map on the card's official website. EYCA has recently launched an iOS application called GeoDiscounts that is designed to help cardholders when traveling with the European Youth Card. Thanks to the GPS it shows the user several EYCA discounts closest to their current location. It is possible to narrow down the search by choosing a category or typing in keywords. Once the users have found the discount(s) they were looking for, they can access detailed information as well as the exact location on a map. Alternatively, they can call or e-mail the place for more information.
