= Identity Cards Act 2006 =

Act of Parliament of the United Kingdom

Identity Cards Act 2006 (Note: Section 44(1).)
- Act of Parliament
- Parliament of the United Kingdom
- Long title: An Act to make provision for a national scheme of registration of individuals and for the issue of cards capable of being used for identifying registered individuals; to make it an offence for a person to be in possession or control of an identity document to which he is not entitled, or of apparatus, articles or materials for making false identity documents; to amend the Consular Fees Act 1980; to make provision facilitating the verification of information provided with an application for a passport; and for connected purposes.
- Citation: 2006 c. 15
- Territorial extent: United Kingdom (Note: Section 44(7).)

Dates
- Royal assent: 30 March 2006
- Commencement: Various (Note: Section 44(2)–(5).)
- Repealed: 21 January 2011
Other legislation
| Amends | Consular Fees Act 1980; Forgery and Counterfeiting Act 1981; Football Spectators Act 1989; Police and Criminal Evidence (Northern Ireland) Order 1989; Criminal Justice Act 1993; Criminal Justice (Northern Ireland) Order 1996; Immigration and Asylum Act 1999; Regulation of Investigatory Powers Act 2000; Criminal Justice and Police Act 2001; Asylum and Immigration (Treatment of Claimants, etc.) Act 2004 |
| Repealed by | Identity Documents Act 2010 |

Status: Repealed

History of passage through Parliament

Text of statute as originally enacted

Revised text of statute as amended

The Identity Cards Act 2006 (c. 15) was an act of the Parliament of the United Kingdom that was repealed in 2011. It created National Identity Cards, a personal identification document and European Economic Area travel document, which were voluntarily issued to British citizens. It also created a resident registry database known as the National Identity Register (NIR), which has since been destroyed. In all around 15,000 National Identity Cards were issued until the act was repealed in 2011. The Identity Card for Foreign nationals was continued in the form of Biometric Residence Permits after 2011 under the provisions of the UK Borders Act 2007 and the Borders, Citizenship and Immigration Act 2009.

National Identity Card
- Front of card (2009)
- Type: Identity card, optional replacement for passport for travel to EU and EFTA countries.
- Issued by: United Kingdom; Identity and Passport Service
- First issued: 2009 (first version); 2011 (discontinued)
- In circulation: 15,000 (2011)
- Purpose: Identification & travel document
- Valid in: United Kingdom; European Union; EFTA; Rest of Europe (except Belarus, Russia, and Ukraine)
- Eligibility: British Citizens
- Expiration: 10 years
- Cost: £30
- Size: ID-1

The introduction of the scheme by the Labour government was much debated, and civil liberty concerns focused primarily on the database underlying the identity cards rather than the cards themselves. The Act specified fifty categories of information that the National Identity Register could hold on each citizen. The legislation further said that those renewing or applying for passports must be entered on to the NIR.

The Conservative/Liberal Democrat Coalition formed following the 2010 general election announced that the ID card scheme would be scrapped. The Identity Cards Act was repealed by the Identity Documents Act 2010 on 21 January 2011, and the cards were invalidated with no refunds to purchasers.

The UK does not have a central civilian registry and there are no identification requirements in public. Driving licences, passports and birth certificates are the most widely used documents for proving identity in the United Kingdom. Most young non-drivers are able to be issued a provisional driving licence, which can be used as ID in some cases, but not all are eligible. Utility bills are the primary document used as evidence of residency. However, authorities and police may require individuals under suspicion without identification to be arrested.

== Development ==
=== Reasons given for the need for introduction ===
Initial attempts to introduce a voluntary identity card were made under the Conservative government of John Major, under then Home Secretary Michael Howard. At the Labour Party conference in 1995, Tony Blair demanded that "instead of wasting hundreds of millions of pounds on compulsory ID cards as the Tory Right demand, let that money provide thousands more police officers on the beat in our local communities." Voluntary Identity Cards were proposed in the Conservative election manifesto for the 1997 general election, in which Labour returned to office.

A proposal for ID cards, to be called "entitlement cards", was initially revived by the Home Secretary at the time, David Blunkett, following the terrorist attacks of 11 September 2001, but was reportedly opposed by Cabinet colleagues. However, rising concerns about identity theft and the misuse of public services led to a proposal in February 2002 for the introduction of entitlement cards to be used to obtain social security services, and a consultation paper, Entitlement Cards and Identity Fraud, was published by the Home Office on 3 July 2002. A public consultation process followed, which resulted in a majority of submissions by organisations being in favour of a scheme to verify a person's identity accurately. However, it was clear that the ability to properly identify a person to their true identity was central to the proposal's operation, with wider implications for operations against crime and terrorism.

In 2003, Blunkett announced that the Government intended to introduce a "British national identity card" linked to a national identity database, the National Identity Register. The proposals were included in the November 2003 Queen's Speech, despite doubts over the ability of the scheme to prevent terrorism. Feedback from the consultation exercise indicated that the term "entitlement card" was superficially softer and warmer, but less familiar and "weaselly", and consequently the euphemism was dropped in favour of "identity card".

During a private seminar for the Fabian Society in August 2005, Tony McNulty, the minister in charge of the scheme, stated "perhaps in the past the government, in its enthusiasm, oversold the advantages of identity cards", and that they "did suggest, or at least implied, that they might well be a panacea for identity fraud, for benefit fraud, terrorism, entitlement and access to public services". He suggested that they should be seen as "a gold standard in proving your identity". Documentation released by the Home Office demonstrated analysis conducted with the private and public sector showed the benefits of the proposed identity card scheme could be quantified at £650m to £1.1bn a year, with a number of other, less quantifiable, strategic benefits — such as disrupting the activities of organised crime and terrorist groups.

=== Legislative progress ===
The Identity Cards Bill was included in the Queen's Speech on 23 November 2004, and introduced to the House of Commons on 29 November.

It was first voted on by Members of Parliament following the second reading of the bill on 20 December 2004, where it passed by 385 votes to 93. The bill was opposed by 19 Labour MPs, 10 Conservative MPs, and the Liberal Democrats, while a number of Labour and Conservative members abstained, in defiance of party policies. A separate vote on a proposal to reject the Bill was defeated by 306 votes to 93. Charles Clarke, the new Home Secretary, had earlier rejected calls to postpone the reading of the Bill following his recent appointment.

The third reading of the bill in the Commons was approved on 11 February 2005 by 224 votes to 64; a majority of 160. Although being in favour in principle, the Conservatives officially abstained, but 11 of their MPs joined 19 Labour MPs in voting against the Government. The Bill then passed to the House of Lords, but there was insufficient time to debate the matter, and Labour were unable to do a deal with the Conservatives in the short time available in the days before Parliament was dissolved on 11 April, following the announcement of the 2005 general election.

Labour's manifesto for the 2005 general election stated that, if returned to power, they would "introduce ID cards, including biometric data like fingerprints, backed up by a national register and rolling out initially on a voluntary basis as people renew their passports". In public speeches and on the campaign trail, Labour made clear that they would bring the same Bill back to Parliament. In contrast, the Liberal Democrat manifesto opposed the idea because, they claimed, ID cards "don't work", while the Conservatives made no mention of the issue.

==== After the 2005 election ====
Following their 2005 general election victory, the Labour Government introduced a new Identity Cards Bill, substantially the same as the previous Bill, into the Commons on 25 May. The Conservatives joined the Liberal Democrats in opposing the Bill, saying that it did not pass their "five tests". These tests included confidence that the scheme could be made to work, and its impact on civil liberties. In December 2005, the Conservative Party elected a new leader, future Prime Minister David Cameron, who opposed ID cards in principle.

The second reading of the Bill on 28 June was passed, 314 votes to 283, a majority of 31.

At its third reading in the Commons on 18 October, the majority in favour fell to 25, with 309 votes in favour to 284 against. In the report stage between the readings, the Bill was amended to prevent the National Identity Register database being linked to the Police National Computer.

In early 2006, the Bill was passed through the House of Lords committee stage, where 279 amendments were considered. One outcome of this was a vote demanding that the Government instruct the National Audit Office to provide a full costing of the scheme over its first ten years, and another demanding that a "secure and reliable method" of recording and storing the data should be found. A third defeat limited the potential for ID cards to be required before people could access public services. On 23 January, the House of Lords defeated the government by backing a fully voluntary scheme.

The committee stage ended on 30 January, and the third reading of the Bill took place on 6 February, after which it returned to the Commons. There, on 18 February, the legislation was carried by a majority of 25, with 25 Labour MPs joining those opposing it. Following the defeats in the House of Lords, the government changed the Bill in order to require separate legislation to make the cards compulsory; however, an amendment to make it possible to apply for a biometric passport without having to register on the National Identity Register database was defeated, overturning the Lords' changes to make the Bill fully voluntary. The Lords' amendment requiring a National Audit Office report was rejected.

The Bill returned to the Lords on 6 March, where the Commons amendments were reversed by a majority of 61. The defeat came despite ministers warning that the Lords should follow the Salisbury Convention by refraining from blocking a manifesto commitment. Both Conservatives and Liberal Democrats stated generally in 2005 that they no longer felt bound to abide by the convention, while in this specific case several Lords stated that it would not apply as the manifesto commitment was for implementation on a voluntary basis as passports are renewed, rather than being compulsory as passports are renewed.

Subsequent votes:

- 13 March: House of Commons — majority of 33 for Government (310 to 277)
- 15 March: House of Lords — majority of 35 against Government (218 to 183)
- 16 March: House of Commons — majority of 51 for Government (292 to 241)
- 20 March: House of Lords — majority of 36 against Government (211 to 175)
- 21 March: House of Commons — majority of 43 for Government (284 to 241)

On 29 March, the House of Lords voted in favour of a new plan with a majority of 227 (287 to 60). Under this scheme, everyone renewing a passport from 2008 would be entered on the national passport and ID database. The Government said that from the identity card's introduction in 2010, people could voluntarily apply for a card, though they would still have to pay for one, and would be placed on the passport and ID database.

The Bill received Royal assent on 30 March 2006.

=== Timescale and implementation progress ===
On 11 October 2006, the Labour government announced a timescale described as "highly ambitious" by computer experts. The Home Office announced that it would publish an ID management action plan in the months from November 2006, followed by agreements with departments on their uses for the system. There was to be a report on potential private sector uses for the scheme before the 2007 Budget.

On 25 September 2006, Home Office Minister Liam Byrne said that "There are opportunities which give me optimism to think that actually there is a way of exploiting systems already in place in a way which brings down the costs quite substantially".

Emails leaked in June 2006 indicated that the plan was already in difficulty, with plans for the early introduction of a limited register and ID card with reduced biometrics known as the "early variant" described as a "huge risk".

Due to the costs of developing a new system from scratch, in 2007, the Government approved an alternative plan to use the Department for Work and Pensions Customer Information System to store the biographical information, linked to a new database to store biometrics, despite concerns over issues of inter-departmental governance, funding and accountability which were never resolved.

The schedule for putting passport applicants' and renewers' details on the National Identity Register (NIR) was never announced. A nationwide network of 68 interview offices for first-time passport applicants started opening in June 2007 and was subsequently completed. The interview consisted mainly of asking applicants to confirm facts about themselves, which someone attempting to steal their identity may not know. The government stated that all personal information used in the interview not required for the application was destroyed shortly after the passport was issued. Fingerprints were not taken. Plans to take iris scans were dropped, although the Government had not ruled them out as a future option.

In March 2008, the Home Secretary announced that people could choose to have an identity card, a passport, or both when they became available (although they could not opt out of having their details recorded on the NIR). On 25 November 2008, people making applications to remain in the United Kingdom as a student or based on marriage were required to have an identity card. Under those plans, it was estimated that by the end of 2014–15 about 90% of all foreign nationals would have been issued with one. On 22 January 2008, the Home Office confirmed that large numbers of cards would not be issued until 2012; however, ID cards were issued to workers in critical locations, starting with airside workers in Manchester and London City airports in 2009, and young people were being offered cards in 2010.

A leaked document, published on 29 January 2008, suggested that "universal compulsion should not be used unless absolutely necessary... due the need for inevitably controversial and time-consuming primary legislation" but that "various forms of coercion, such as designation of the application process for identity documents issued by British ministers (e.g. passports) were an option to stimulate applications in a manageable way".

In January 2008, the Financial Times reported that Accenture and BAE Systems had withdrawn from the procurement process. Fujitsu Services, CSC, EDS, IBM, Steria and Thales Group were still negotiating framework agreements with the government. On 1 August 2008, it was confirmed that Thales Group was awarded a four-year contract to work on the design, building, testing and operation of the National Identity Scheme.

On 25 September 2008, Jacqui Smith unveiled replicas of the first actual cards to be issued as residence permits to foreign nationals.

The first to receive ID cards were foreign nationals, from 25 November 2008. This scheme continued as the Biometric Residence Permit.

National Identity Cards for British nationals became voluntarily available to people resident in the Greater Manchester area on 30 November 2009. Availability was planned to be expanded to all British Citizens on a voluntary basis by 2012. A Home Office minister, Meg Hillier, said that they would be a "convenient way for young people to prove their age when going to bars" and at £30 they were cheaper than purchasing passports (£77.50 at the time).

Although in later rollout stages, it was envisioned that retailers could accept applications and be able to charge processing fees; the total cost to applicants was expected to be up to £60 per card.

In December 2009, while on a trip to promote identity cards, then Parliamentary Under-Secretary for Identity Meg Hillier had to admit she had forgotten hers and was left unable to display one for photographers. The Manchester Evening News revealed in 2010 that senior Whitehall officials were urged to email friends and relatives encouraging them to buy cards, because of fears about the level of demand.

=== Identity card for foreign nationals (Biometric Residence Permit) ===
Originally called the Identity Card for Foreign Nationals which was blue and pink in colour, was continued and renamed the Biometric Residence Permit, still issued as of 2024. It followed the common EU format until the UK's exit from the European Union.

Their issuance began in November 2008 when non-European Union foreign nationals with permission to stay in the UK on the basis of a student visa or a marriage/civil partnership visa would, when applying to extend their stay, be required to apply for an ID card. This was later expanded to all non-EU residents.

=== Initial rollout ===
A specimen of a British National Identity Card, issued briefly from October 2009 to May 2010.

The initial rollout began on a regional basis, first in Greater Manchester. The cards were voluntary and cost £30 and were issued by the Identity and Passport Service, until its eventual cancellation.

- October 2009: Greater Manchester residents – applications opened to all residents of Greater Manchester
- November 2009: Air industry staff – a pilot scheme involving free, voluntary ID cards for airside workers at Manchester and London City airports.
- January 2010: North West England - applications opened to residents in Cheshire, Merseyside, Lancashire and Cumbria
- February 2010: Young London residents – applications opened to all residents of London aged 16–24 who already had a passport or a recently expired one.
- February 2010: Citizens over the age of 16 if registered for IPS newsletter updates – 21,000 people were registered for updates at the time

==== Planned wider rollout ====
- Young people opening bank accounts (voluntary) – in 2010, young people would have been encouraged to get ID cards when they opened bank accounts.
- Citizens over the age of 16 applying for a passport (voluntary) intended in 2011–2012, optional, but applicants' details would have been entered into the National Identity Register

=== 2010 general election ===
During the 2010 general election campaign, the published manifestos of the various parties revealed that the Labour Party planned to continue the introduction of the identity card scheme, while all other parties pledged to discontinue plans to issue ID cards. The Conservative Party also explicitly pledged to scrap the National Identity Register, while the wording of several other manifestos implied that this may have been the position of certain other parties too.

=== Ending of the scheme ===
In the Conservative–Liberal Democrat coalition agreement that followed the 2010 general election, the new government announced that they planned to scrap the ID card scheme, including the National Identity Register (as well as the next generation of biometric passports and the ContactPoint database), as part of their measures "to reverse the substantial erosion of civil liberties under the Labour Government and roll back state intrusion."

In a document published in May 2010 at the time of the Queen's Speech, the new Government announced that the scrapping of the scheme would save approximately £86 million over the following 4 years, and avoid a further £800 million in maintenance costs over the decade which were to have been recovered through fees.

The Identity Documents Act 2010 was announced on 27 May 2010, passed by the House of Commons on 15 September 2010 and received Royal Assent on 21 December 2010. Section 1(1) of the Identity Documents Act repealed the Identity Cards Act 2006 on 21 January 2011 (making ID cards invalid) and mandated the destruction of all data on the National Identity Register by 21 February 2011.

In May 2010 the Identity and Passport service stopped accepting applications for identity cards. On 21 January 2011, identity cards already issued became invalid, despite the cards themselves stating a 10-year expiry.

In all around 15,000 National Identity Cards were issued until the act was repealed in 2011. A banker from Germany with joint British and Swiss nationality was arguably the last person to officially use the ID card on a flight from Düsseldorf to Manchester on 21 January 2011, landing 90 minutes before the scheme was officially scrapped at midnight. No refunds were offered to cardholders who paid £30 for the card.

The National Identity Register was officially destroyed on Thursday, 10 February 2011, when the final 500 hard drives containing the register were shredded at RDC in Witham, Essex.

Some aspects of the original Identity Cards Act were continued including biometric British passports as well as the Identity Card for Foreign Nationals, which were renamed and continued as Biometric Residence Permits (BRP).

== Historical and international comparisons ==
=== ID cards during the World Wars ===
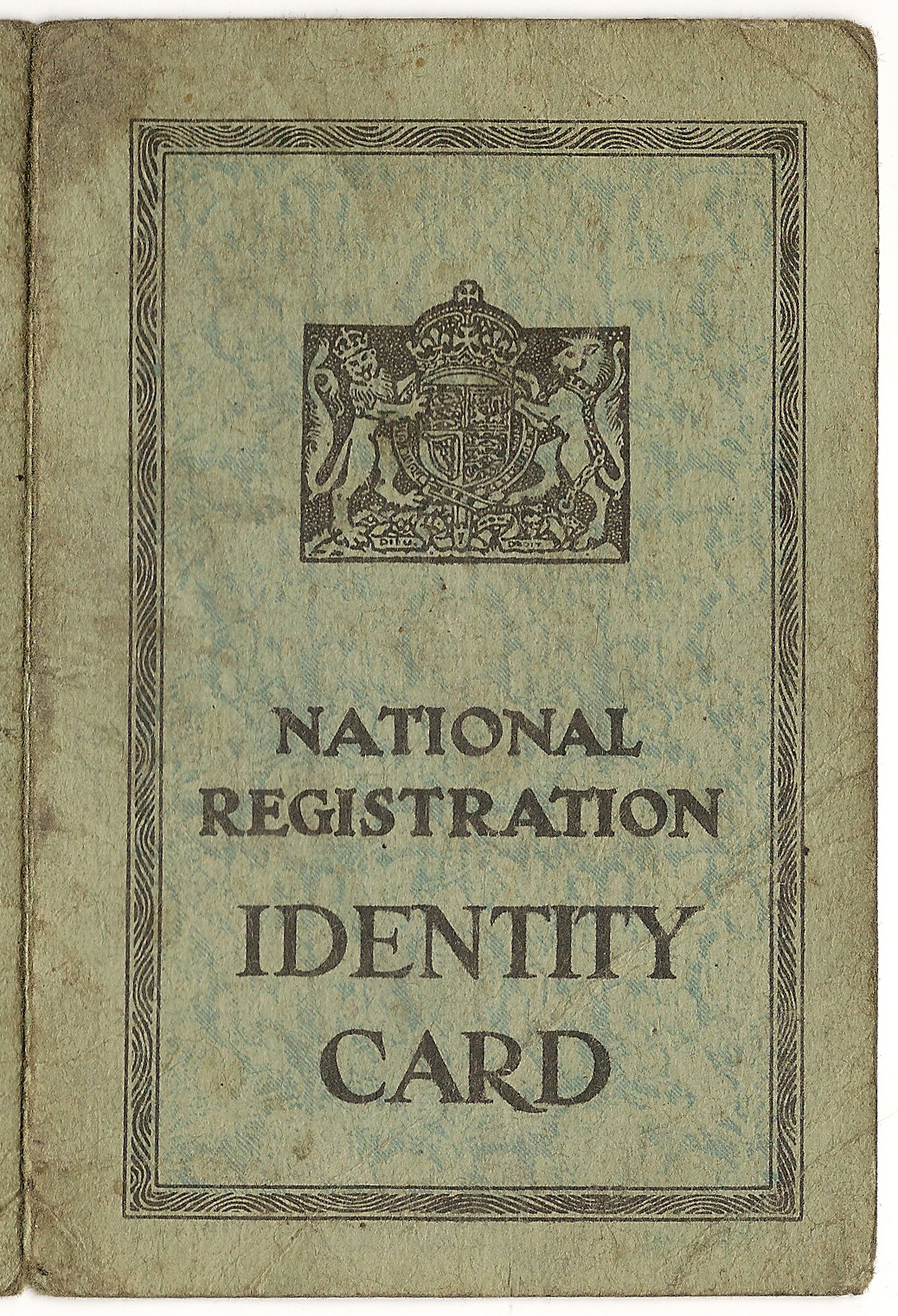
A mid-20th century ID card

Compulsory identity cards were first issued in the United Kingdom during World War I, and abandoned in 1919. Cards were re-introduced during World War II under the National Registration Act 1939, but were abandoned seven years after the end of that war, in 1952, amid widespread public resentment. The National Register became the National Health Service Register and is maintained to this day. Wartime alphanumeric identity numbers continued to be used as NHS numbers until 1996, when they were replaced by new fully numeric identifiers.

The World War I identity card scheme was unpopular, though accepted in the light of the prevailing national emergency. It is possible to take a small measure of how the national identity scheme was received from remarks by the historian A. J. P. Taylor in his English History, 1914–1945, where he describes the whole thing as an "indignity" and talks of the Home Guard "harassing" people for their cards.

After the Second World War the government of Clement Attlee decided to continue the scheme in the face of the Cold War and the perceived Soviet threat, though it grew ever less popular. Identity cards also became the subject of a celebrated civil liberties case in 1950. Harry Willcock, a member of the Liberal Party, refused to produce his after being stopped by the police. During his subsequent trial he argued that identity cards had no place in peacetime, a defence rejected by the magistrate's court. In his subsequent appeal, Willcock v Muckle, the judgment of the lower court was upheld.

Protest reached Parliament, where the Conservative and Liberal peers voiced their anger over what they saw as "Socialist card-indexing". After the defeat of the Labour Government in the general election of October 1951 the incoming Conservative administration of Winston Churchill was pledged to get rid of the scheme, "to set the people free", in the words of one minister. Cheers rang out when on 21 February 1952 the Minister for Health, Harry Crookshank, announced in the House of Commons that national identity cards were to be scrapped. This was a popular move, adopted against the wishes of the police and the security services, though the decision to repeal the 1939 legislation was, in significant part, driven by the need for economies. By 1952 national registration was costing £500,000 per annum (about equivalent to £12,500,000 in 2025) and required 1500 civil servants to administer it.

=== International comparisons ===
==== Identity cards ====
Generally, most countries in the world issue identity cards, with the exception generally being countries in the anglosphere. For example, Australia started work on a health and social services access card, but the government elected in the 2007 federal election cancelled it. However an exception is the US passport card is issued with similar properties to an identity card.

Identity cards are issued in every EU/EEA country except for Denmark and Ireland. However, since 2015, Ireland issues a passport card with similar properties to an identity card and Danish municipalities issue simpler identity cards (which are not valid for international travel). They are compulsory in 14 EU countries, voluntary in 9 countries and in 8 countries they are semi-compulsory (some form of identification required). They can be used to travel within the EU/EEA.

During the British Presidency of the EU in 2005, a decision was made to "agree common standards for security features and secure issuing procedures for ID cards (December 2005), with detailed standards agreed as soon as possible thereafter. In this respect, the British Presidency has put forward a proposal for EU-wide use of biometrics in national ID cards." In 2019, a harmonised model for identity cards in the EU was adopted and was in force in 2021, introducing biometric functionality and a standardised format.

==== Biometrics in identity and travel documents ====
There has been an international move towards the introduction of biometrics into identity and travel documents. The ICAO has recommended that all countries adopt biometric passports, and the United States has made it a requirement for entering the US under the visa waiver programme. Biometric passports are issued in many countries, including in British passports. Internationally, the only requirement for biometric passports is a digital photograph.

== System ==
=== Legal requirements ===
Under the NIS, residents who wanted or were required to apply for an ID card would have been required to fulfil certain functions:

- Attend in person to have their fingerprints recorded at one of the Identity & Passport Service's high street partners.
- Promptly inform the police or Identity & Passport Service if a card is lost or damaged, and apply for a new card.
- Promptly inform the Identity & Passport Service of any change of address.
- Promptly inform the Identity & Passport Service of any prescribed change of circumstances affecting the information recorded about them in the Register.

Failure to do so would have meant a penalty of up to £1,000 or a shortened permission to stay.

=== National Identity Register ===
Key to the ID Card scheme was a centralised computer database, the National Identity Register (NIR). To identify someone it would not have been necessary to check their card, since identity could be determined by a taking a biometric scan and matching it against a database entry.

ID cards for foreign nationals were produced by the Driver and Vehicle Licensing Agency (DVLA) in Swansea on behalf of the Home Office.

=== Identity Registration Number ===
One entry on the NIR was the Identity Registration Number. The Home Office had recognised that a unique identifier was needed as a primary key for the database.

The Home Office's Identity Cards Benefits Overview document described how the IRN would have enabled data sharing amongst police, legal and corporate databases (including bank and travel operators).

=== Types of cards ===
Three types of identity cards were issued:

- The National Identity Card, which was lilac and salmon in colour, was issued to British citizens only. It contained the text "British Citizen" and was a valid travel document for entry into any EEA state and Switzerland until its invalidation in 2010.
- The Identification Card was turquoise and green in colour and did not mention the holder's nationality. It was issued to EU, EEA and Swiss citizens living in the UK (including Irish citizens living in Northern Ireland). It was also issued to certain family members of EU/EEA citizens, to British citizens to whom certain conditions or restrictions apply, and as an additional card to a person living in two gender roles.
- The Identity Card for Foreign Nationals was blue and pink in colour and was issued to certain categories of immigrants from non-EU/EEA countries. They were renamed and continued in the form of Biometric Residence Permits.

== Use as travel document ==
Until midnight on 21 January 2011, the National Identity Card was officially recognised as a valid travel document by the EEA and Switzerland, following which the United Kingdom instructed immigration authorities therein to cease accepting it as a valid travel document. It also became accepted voluntarily by a number of other European countries but its current validity in these additional countries remains unclear, given that its acceptance and subsequent denial by these countries was never mandated by the United Kingdom through EU or EEA channels. It was the only travel document valid for use by British nationals throughout the EEA and Switzerland, other than a valid British citizen passport or a pink Gibraltar identity card. The exception to this was for travel to the Republic of Ireland. All British citizens are entitled to enter the Republic of Ireland without the need to carry a valid travel document, on account of the Common Travel Area agreement, though in practice, the Irish Naturalisation and Immigration Service or Garda Síochána systematically require proof of identity from all travellers landing in Irish airports from the UK.

- European Union
- Iceland (EEA)
- Liechtenstein (EEA)
- Norway (EEA)
- Switzerland

It became accepted also by:

- Albania
- Andorra "Any travel document recognised by France or Spain"
- Bosnia and Herzegovina
- Croatia
- Faroe Islands
- North Macedonia
- Monaco
- Montenegro
- Morocco (only for tours organised by a travel agency for groups of more than three people)
- San Marino
- Serbia
- Vatican City

It was also accepted as a travel document to enter the British Crown Dependencies and the British Overseas Territories:

- Gibraltar Part of EU
- Guernsey Part of Common Travel Area — no travel document required to enter from the UK. (NB: Air travellers require photo ID for airline security purposes.)
- Isle of Man Part of Common Travel Area — no travel document required to enter from the UK. (NB: Air travellers require photo ID for airline security purposes.)
- Jersey Part of Common Travel Area — no travel document required to enter from the UK. (NB: Air travellers require photo ID for airline security purposes.)

All other overseas territories require a fully valid passport. Of the two countries closest to the UK not to accept British ID cards, Ukraine and Belarus, the latter requires not only a passport but also for British citizens to obtain a visa in advance (except if entering and exiting through Minsk airport and staying for max 5 days).

Initially, some travel companies initially refused to carry passengers with UK National Identity Cards due to their novelty.

== Reaction ==
The announcement of the scheme had seen a mixed reaction from both the public and from figures connected to terrorism and law enforcement.

=== Public reaction ===
Over a period of time, public opinion, as measured by opinion polls, appears to have shifted away from support for the scheme towards opposition. This appeared to have become more of a concern since the disclosure of the loss of 25 million records by HM Revenue and Customs.

In 2003, the announcement of the scheme was followed by a public consultation exercise, particularly among 'stakeholder groups'. At March 2003 the government stated that the overall results were:

in favour: 2606 responses (61%)
against: 1587 responses (38%)
neutral: 48 responses (1%)

By July 2006, an ICM poll indicated that public support had fallen to 46%, with opposition at 51%.

A further poll by YouGov/Daily Telegraph, published on 4 December 2006, indicated support for the identity card element of the scheme at 50%, with 39% opposed. Support for the national database was weaker, with 22% happy and 78% unhappy with the prospect of having their data recorded. Only 11% trusted the government to keep the data confidential. 3.12% of the sample were prepared to undergo long prison sentences rather than have a card.

=== Terrorism and crime ===
Eliza Manningham-Buller, the former head of Britain's counter-intelligence and security agency MI5 was on record as supporting the introduction of identity cards, as was Sir Ian Blair, former Commissioner of the Metropolitan Police and his predecessor, Sir John (now Lord) Stevens. The Association of Chief Police Officers was also supportive.

However, in November 2005, Dame Stella Rimington, who was Director General of MI5 before Eliza Manningham-Buller, questioned the usefulness of the proposed scheme. This intervention caused a good deal of controversy amongst supporters and opponents of the scheme, especially as Manningham-Buller stated that ID cards would in fact disrupt the activities of terrorists, noting that significant numbers of terrorists take advantage of the weaknesses of current identification methods to assist their activities.

Lord Carlile was appointed after 11 September attacks on New York and Washington in 2001 to independently review the working of the Terrorism Act 2000 and subsequent anti-terrorist laws. Talking on GMTV on 29 January 2006, he expressed his views on the proposed legislation, saying that ID cards could be of limited value in the fight against terrorism but that Parliament had to judge that value against the curtailment of civil liberties. Speaking on the same programme, Lord Stevens of Kirkwhelpington, former Met Police Commissioner, argued in favour for the need for identity cards, saying they had benefits in tackling serious crimes, such as money laundering and identity theft.

== Objections to the scheme ==
=== Costs ===
By the time the Act was repealed, the Home Office stated that £257 million had been spent specifically on implementing identity cards.

The estimated combined 10-year cost of the biometric passport and identity scheme was £5.612bn in November 2007. Much of the cost involved was due to the introduction and production of biometric passports, which became standard worldwide and British passports continued to be issued biometrically. Up to 70% of the total cost was due to biometric passport issuances.

Independent studies including one by the London School of Economics had forecasted that total costs of implementing the biometric identity and passport scheme could be as much as £10.6 billion to £19.2 billion, with an estimated £814 million to £1,200 million from costs directly attributed to ID card issuance. The reliability of this study was challenged by the Labour Government which disputed some of the assumptions used in the calculations, such as the need to retake biometric information every 5 years. The government argued that this assumption had not been supported by any research in the London School of Economics report, and that biometric experts quoted in the LSE reports had sought to distance themselves from its findings. The Government also claimed that the authors of these estimates were established opponents to the scheme and could not be considered unbiased academic sources.

Tony McNulty, Home Office minister who was responsible for the scheme, responded by saying a "ceiling" on costs would be announced in October 2005. There were indications that the Labour Government was looking at ways of subsidising the scheme by charging other Government Departments, with the implication that this would result in increased charges for other Government services to individuals or businesses.

The Labour Government abandoned plans for a giant new computer system to run the national identity card scheme. Instead of a single multibillion-pound system, information was held on three existing, separate databases.

An estimate from the Home Office placed the cost of a passport and ID card package at £85, while after the 2005 general election in May 2005 they issued a revised figure of over £93, and announced that a standalone ID card would cost £30. In 2009, it was announced that retailers would be collecting fingerprints and photographs, and that they would be able to charge for this, meaning that the total cost for a standalone ID card was expected to be up to £60.

=== Effectiveness ===
The then Home Secretary David Blunkett stated in 2004 said the cards would stop people using multiple identities and boost the fight against terrorism and organised crime. However, human rights group Liberty disputed this, pointing out that the existence of another form of ID cards in Spain did not prevent the Madrid train bombings.

However, Blunkett subsequently made a significant U-turn. At his opening speech for Infosecurity Europe on 27 April 2009, he stepped back from the concept of a full National Identity Database for every citizen, saying it would be sufficient to improve the verification of passports.

His successor, Charles Clarke, said that ID cards "cannot stop attacks", in the aftermath of the 7 July 2005 London bombings, and added that he doubted it would have prevented the atrocities. However, he felt that on the balance between protecting civil liberties and preventing crime, ID cards would help rather than hinder.

=== Ethnic minorities ===
The Government's Race Equality Impact Assessment indicated significant concern among ethnic groups over how the police would use their powers under an Identity Cards Act 2006, with 64% of black and 53% of Indian respondents having expressed concern, particularly about the potential for abuse and discrimination. In their January 2005 report on the Bill, the Commission for Racial Equality stated that the fear of discrimination is neither misconceived nor exaggerated, and note that this is also an ongoing issue in Germany, the Netherlands and France.

The CRE were also concerned that disproportionate requirements by employers and the authorities for ethnic minorities to identify themselves may lead to a two-tiered structure amongst racial groups, with foreign nationals and British ethnic minorities feeling compelled to register while British white people do not.

According to the CRE, certain groups who move location frequently and who tend to live on low incomes (such as Romani people, travellers, asylum-seekers and refugees) would risk being criminalised under the legislation through failing to update their registration each time they moved due to lack of funds to pay the fee that may be charged.

=== Concerns raised by the Information Commissioner ===
In a press release on 30 July 2004, Richard Thomas the Information Commissioner's Office stated that a NIR raised substantial data protection and personal privacy concerns. He sought clarification of why so much personal information needed to be kept as part of establishing an individual's identity and indicated concern about the wide range of bodies who would view the records of services individuals have used. The Commissioner also pointed out that those who renew or apply for a driving licence or passport were to be automatically added to the National Identity Register, and so would lose the option of not registering. He subsequently stated: "My anxiety is that we don't sleepwalk into a surveillance society." In February 2003, on BBC Radio 4's Today programme, he warned that ID cards could become a target for identity theft by organised crime.

=== Human rights ===
On 2 February 2005, the British Parliament's Joint Committee on Human Rights questioned the compatibility of the Bill with Article 8 of the European Convention on Human Rights (the right to respect for private life) and Article 14 (the right to non-discrimination), both of which are encapsulated in the Human Rights Act 1998.

=== Feature creep ===
Even without new primary legislation, the Identity Cards Act 2006 allowed the potential scope of the scheme to be much greater than that usually publicised by the Government.

For example, Gordon Brown was reported to be "planning a massive expansion of the ID cards project that would widen surveillance of everyday life by allowing high-street businesses to share confidential information with police databases." Francis Elliott reporting on the development for The Independent noted that "police could be alerted as soon as a wanted person used a biometric-enabled cash card or even entered a building via an iris-scan door".

The wartime National Registration ID card expanded from 3 functions to 39 by the time it was abolished.

Concerns had also been raised following Tony Blair's response to an ID card petition stating that the fingerprint register would be used to compare the fingerprints of the population at large against the records of 900,000 unsolved crimes. Opposition MPs claimed that the use of the biometric data in this way would directly breach promises given during the Commons debate that there would be adequate safeguards preventing the use of ID card data for "fishing expeditions".

=== Database extent and access ===
Home Office forecasts envisaged that "265 government departments and as many as 48,000 accredited private sector organisations" would have had access to the database, and that 163 million identity verifications or more would take place each year. However, the IPS had stated that only the data needed for the passport would have been kept and that organisations that have permission to access the data held on the Register could only have done so with the individual's permission, unless to prevent or investigate a crime.

=== Vulnerable individuals ===
The CRE had also recommended that more work was required to protect the interests of vulnerable individuals. For example, people escaping from domestic violence or a forced marriage may have been at risk if their previous names or addresses were disclosed. Minister Meg Hillier, in a letter to The Spectator magazine, claimed that as the ID card would not have someone's address on it, it would protect such a person's privacy in a way currently unavailable.

=== Identity theft ===
In May 2005, Tony Blair said "ID cards are needed to stop the soaring costs of identity theft". However, security experts claimed that placing trust in a single document may make identity theft easier, since only this document needs to be targeted.

=== Technology ===
One test of facial recognition software dating from 2006 showed facial recognition error rates of up to 52% for disabled persons.

== Opposition campaigns ==
In May 2006, NO2ID launched the "Renew for Freedom" campaign, urging passport holders to renew their passports in the summer of 2006 to delay being entered on the National Identity Register. This followed the comment made by Charles Clarke in the House of Commons that "anyone who feels strongly enough about the linkage [between passports and the ID scheme] not to want to be issued with an ID card in the initial phase will be free to surrender their existing passport and apply for a new passport before the designation order takes effect".

In response, the Home Office said that it was "hard to see what would be achieved, other than incurring unnecessary expense" by renewing passports early. However, the cost of a non-biometric passport was £51 at the time, then increased in 2006 and 2007 to £72. This was due to rise to £93 after the introduction of biometric passports, which was inevitable due to increased document security requirements around the world. The US introduced a requirement for biometric passports to be used for entry from 2015 for Visa Waivier Program access.

On 14 November 2007, the NO2ID opposition group called for financial donations from the 11,360 people who had pledged to contribute to a fighting fund opposing the legislation. The organisation planned to challenge the statutory instruments that were planned to be brought in to enable the ID card scheme.

Baroness Williams and Nick Clegg said in 2007 that they would take part in civil disobedience campaigns by refusing to register for an ID card, or to attend photographic sittings, despite the cards being voluntary.

=== Scotland ===
Although policy on passports and the National Identity Scheme was not an area devolved to the Scottish Government, on 19 November 2008, the Scottish Parliament voted to reject the ID card scheme, with no votes against the government motion, and only the Scottish Labour MSPs abstaining. In 2005, the previous Labour-Liberal Democrat coalition government had stated that "the proposals for an identity card scheme confine themselves to reserved policy areas only", and that ID cards will not be needed to access devolved services in Scotland, e.g. health, education, the legal system and transport. However the Scottish National Entitlement Card is required to obtain concessionary travel. It can also be used as Proof of Age for young people (Young Scot NEC) and give access to civic services such as libraries and leisure centres depending on the local authority.

=== Northern Ireland ===
The introduction of compulsory ID cards to Northern Ireland would likely have provoked serious opposition given the large Nationalist community who regard themselves as Irish and not British. In an effort to counter this, the British Government decided not to include the Union Flag on the card, and had stated that a separate card will be issued to Northern Irish people who identify their nationality as Irish. The separate card would not have included any statement of nationality and could not have been used as an EEA travel document (as only the Irish Government may issue travel documents for Irish citizens, wherever resident). Home Secretary Alan Johnson had also stated that the inclusion of Northern Irish people on the National Identity Register of British citizens would not have prevented such people from claiming full Irish citizenship rights.

== See also ==
- Common Travel Area – Open-borders area between the United Kingdom and Ireland
- National Insurance number
- UK Digital ID
