= Term of office =

Set length of time a person serves in an elected position

A term of office, electoral term, or parliamentary term is the length of time a person serves in a particular elected office. In many jurisdictions there is a defined limit on how long terms of office may be before the officeholder must be subject to re-election. Some jurisdictions exercise term limits, setting a maximum number of terms an individual may hold in a particular office.

== Terms of office by country ==
Heads of state
Upper houses
Lower houses
Legend
<3	3	4	5	6	7	>7
Not applicable		Unclear		Varies	Until removed from office	

Numbers in years unless stated otherwise. Some countries where fixed-term elections are uncommon, the legislature is almost always dissolved earlier than its expiry date. "Until removed from office" refers to offices that do not have fixed terms; in these cases, the officeholder(s) may serve indefinitely until death, abdication, resignation, retirement, or forcible removal from office (such as impeachment).

In most cases where the head of government is a different person from the head of state, its term of office is identical to the chamber that elected it (the legislature if it is unicameral, or more usually the lower house if it is bicameral), unless it does not survive a vote of no confidence.

Country	Head of state	Members of the upper house (Note: Excludes senators for life.)	Members of the lower house
Afghanistan	Until removed from office	—N/a	—N/a
Albania	5	—N/a	4
Algeria	5	6	5
Andorra	Until removed by the Pope (Bishop of Urgell); 5 (President of France)	—N/a	4
Angola	5	—N/a	5
Antigua and Barbuda	For life (King of the United Kingdom)	5	5
Argentina	4	6	4
Armenia	7	—N/a	5
Australia	For life (King of the United Kingdom)	3 to 6	3
Austria	6	5 to 6	5
Azerbaijan	7	—N/a	5
Bahamas	For life (King of the United Kingdom)	5	5
Bahrain	For life	4	4
Bangladesh	5	—N/a	5
Barbados	4	5	5
Belarus	5	4	4
Belgium	For life	5	5
Belize	For life (King of the United Kingdom)	5	5
Benin	7	—N/a	7
Bhutan	For life	5	5
Bolivia	5	5	5
Bosnia and Herzegovina	4 (Note: The Presidency of Bosnia and Herzegovina is composed of three members as a collective head of state, all elected at the same time via popular vote, by different constituencies each, every four years.)	4	4
Botswana	5	—N/a	5
Brazil	4	8	4
Bulgaria	5	—N/a	4
Burkina Faso	5	6	5
Burundi	7	5	5
Brunei	For life	—N/a	5
Cambodia	For life	6	5
Cameroon	7	5	5
Canada	For life (King of the United Kingdom)	Until removed from office	4
Cape Verde	5	—N/a	5
Central African Republic	7	—N/a	7
Chad	5	—N/a	5
Chile	4	8	4
China	5	—N/a	5
Taiwan	4	—N/a	4
Colombia	4	4	4
Congo	5	6	5
Comoros	5	—N/a	5
Ivory Coast	5	5	5
Costa Rica	4	—N/a	4
Croatia	5	—N/a	4
Cuba	5	—N/a	5
Cyprus	5	—N/a	5
Czech Republic	5	6	4
DR Congo	5	5	5
Denmark	For life	—N/a	4
Djibouti	5	—N/a	5
Dominica	5	—N/a	5
Dominican Republic	4	4	4
Ecuador	4	—N/a	4
Egypt	6	5	5
El Salvador	5	—N/a	3
Equatorial Guinea	7	—N/a	5
Eritrea	Until removed from office (Note: The 1997 Constitution of Eritrea defines a de jure term length of five years for the President and National Assembly, however to this date it has not been implemented.)	—N/a	Until removed from office
Estonia	5	—N/a	4
Eswatini	For life	5	5
Ethiopia	6	—N/a	5
Fiji	3	—N/a	4
Finland	6	—N/a	4
France	5	6	5
Gabon	7	5	5
Gambia	5	—N/a	5
Georgia	5	—N/a	4
Germany	5	4 to 5	4
Ghana	4	—N/a	4
Greece	5	—N/a	4
Grenada	For life (King of the United Kingdom)	5	5
Guatemala	4	—N/a	4
Guinea	5	—N/a	5
Guinea-Bissau	5	—N/a	5
Guyana	5	—N/a	5
Haiti	5	6	4
Honduras	4	—N/a	4
Hungary	5	—N/a	4
Iceland	4	—N/a	4
India	5	6	5
Indonesia	5	5	5
Iran	Until removed from office	—N/a	4
Iraq	4	—N/a	4
Ireland	7	5	5
Israel	7	—N/a	4
Italy (Note: In Italy the prorogatio, unlike the real extension of the term, does not affect the duration of the electoral mandate, but only concerns the exercise of the powers in the interval between the deadline, natural or anticipated, of this mandate, and the entry into office of the new elected body.)	7	5	5
Jamaica	For life (King of the United Kingdom)	5	5
Japan	For life	6	4
Jordan	For life	4	4
Kazakhstan	7	6	5
Kenya	5	5	5
Kiribati	4	—N/a	4
Kosovo	5	—N/a	4
Kuwait	For life	—N/a	4
Kyrgyzstan	5	—N/a	5
Laos	5	—N/a	5
Latvia	4	—N/a	4
Lebanon	6	—N/a	4
Libya	Until removed from office	Until removed from office	Until removed from office
Lesotho	For life	5	5
Liberia	6	9	6
Liechtenstein	For life	—N/a	4
Lithuania	5	—N/a	4
Luxembourg	For life	—N/a	5
North Macedonia	5	—N/a	4
Madagascar	5	5	5
Malawi	5	—N/a	5
Malaysia	5	3	5
Maldives	5	—N/a	5
Mali	5	—N/a	5
Malta	5	—N/a	5
Marshall Islands	4	—N/a	4
Mauritania	5	—N/a	5
Mauritius	5	—N/a	5
Mexico	6	6	3
Federated States of Micronesia	4	4	2
Monaco	For life	—N/a	5
Mongolia	6	—N/a	4
Moldova	4	—N/a	4
Montenegro	5	—N/a	4
Morocco	For life	6	5
Mozambique	5	—N/a	5
Myanmar	5	5	5
Namibia	5	6	5
Nauru	3	—N/a	3
Nepal	5	6	5
Netherlands	For life	4	4
New Zealand	For life (King of the United Kingdom)	—N/a	3
Nicaragua	5	—N/a	5
Nigeria	4	4	4
Niger	5	—N/a	5
North Korea	5	—N/a	5
Norway	For life	—N/a	4
Oman	For life	4	4
Pakistan	5	6	5
Palau	4	4	4
Palestine	4	—N/a	4
Panama	5	—N/a	5
Papua New Guinea	For life (King of the United Kingdom)	—N/a	5
Paraguay	5	5*	5
Peru	5	—N/a	5
Philippines	6	6	3
Poland	5	4	4
Portugal	5	—N/a	4
Qatar	For life	—N/a	4
Romania	5	4	4
Russia	6	—N/a	5
Rwanda	5	—N/a	5
Saint Kitts and Nevis	For life (King of the United Kingdom)	—N/a	5
Saint Lucia	For life (King of the United Kingdom)	5	5
Saint Vincent and the Grenadines	For life (King of the United Kingdom)	—N/a	5
Samoa	5	—N/a	5
San Marino	0.5 (6 months)	—N/a	5
São Tomé and Príncipe	5	—N/a	4
Saudi Arabia	For life	—N/a	4
Senegal	5	5	5
Serbia	5	—N/a	4
Seychelles	5	—N/a	5
Sierra Leone	5	—N/a	5
Singapore	6	—N/a	5
Slovakia	5	—N/a	4
Slovenia	5	5	4
Solomon Islands	Until removed from office	—N/a	4
Somalia	4	—N/a	4
South Africa	5	5	5
South Korea	5	—N/a	4
South Sudan	5	Unknown	5
Spain	For life	4	4
Sri Lanka	5	—N/a	5
Sudan	Until removed from office	Until removed from office	Until removed from office
Suriname	5	—N/a	5
Sweden	For life	—N/a	4
Switzerland	4 (Note: The Federal Council of Switzerland is composed of seven members as a collective head of state, all elected at the same time by the Federal Assembly of Switzerland every four years.)	4	4
Syria	5	—N/a	4
Tajikistan	7	5	5
Tanzania	5	—N/a	5
Thailand	For life	5	4
Timor-Leste	5	—N/a	5
Togo	5	—N/a	5
Tonga	For life	—N/a	5
Trinidad and Tobago	5	5	5
Tunisia	5	—N/a	5
Turkey	5	—N/a	5
Turkmenistan	7	—N/a	5
Tuvalu	For life (King of the United Kingdom)	—N/a	4
Uganda	5	—N/a	5
Ukraine	5	—N/a	5
United Arab Emirates	5	—N/a	4
United Kingdom	For life (King of the United Kingdom)	Until removed from office	5
United States	4	6	2
Uruguay	5	5	5
Uzbekistan	7	5	5
Vanuatu	5	—N/a	4
Vatican City	For life (Bishop of Rome)	—N/a	5
Venezuela	6	—N/a	5
Vietnam	5	—N/a	5
Yemen	7	—N/a	6
Zambia	5	—N/a	5
Zimbabwe	7	7	7

== United Kingdom ==
Being the origin of the Westminster system, aspects of the United Kingdom's system of government are replicated in many other countries.

=== Monarch ===
The monarch serves as head of state until his or her death or abdication.

=== House of Commons ===
In the United Kingdom Members of Parliament (MPs) in the House of Commons are elected for the duration of the parliament. Following dissolution of the Parliament, a general election is held which consists of simultaneous elections for all seats. For most MPs this means that their terms of office are identical to the duration of the Parliament. An individual's term may be cut short by death or resignation. An MP elected in a by-election mid-way through a Parliament, regardless of how long they have occupied the seat, is not exempt from facing re-election at the next general election.

The Septennial Act 1715 provided that a Parliament expired seven years after it had been summoned; this maximum period was reduced to five years by the Parliament Act 1911. Prior to the Fixed-term Parliaments Act 2011 parliaments had no minimum duration. Parliaments could be dissolved early by the monarch at the prime minister's request. Early dissolutions occurred when the make-up of Parliament made forming government impossible (as occurred in 1974), or, more commonly, when the incumbent government reasoned an early general election would improve their re-election chances (e.g. 2001). The Fixed-term Parliaments Act 2011 mandated that Parliaments should last their full five years; early dissolution remained possible but under much more limited circumstances. However, the act was repealed in 2022 and replaced with the Dissolution and Calling of Parliament Act 2022, which restored the pre-2011 constitutional situation.

Because the government and prime minister are effectively indirectly elected through the Commons, the terms of Parliaments and MPs do not directly apply to offices of government, though in practice these are affected by changes in Parliament. While, strictly speaking, a prime minister whose incumbency spans multiple Parliaments only serves one, unbroken, term of office, some writers may refer to the different Parliaments as separate terms.

=== House of Lords ===
Hereditary peers and life peers retain membership of the House of Lords for life, though members can resign or be expelled. Lords Spiritual hold membership of the House of Lords until the end of their time as bishops, though a senior bishop may be made a life peer upon the end of their bishopric (e.g. George Carey, made Baron Carey of Clifton the day after he ceased being Archbishop of Canterbury).

=== Devolved legislatures ===
The devolved legislatures in Scotland, Wales and Northern Ireland have fixed terms. In Scotland and Northern Ireland, these are five years, while in Wales the fixed term is four years.

Extraordinary general elections to the devolved legislatures are held if no first minister (or, in the case of Northern Ireland, first minister and deputy first minister) is nominated within a particular period of time, or if two thirds of members of the relevant legislature vote for an extraordinary general election.

=== Other elected offices ===
Offices of local government other regional elected officials follow similar rules to the national offices discussed above, with persons elected to fixed terms of a few years.

== United States ==
=== Federal ===
In the United States, the president of the United States is elected indirectly through the United States Electoral College to a four-year term, with a term limit of two terms (totaling eight years) or a maximum of ten years if the president acted as president for two years or less in a term where another was elected as president, imposed by the Twenty-second Amendment to the United States Constitution, ratified in 1951.

The Vice President also serves four-year terms but without any term limit. U.S. Representatives serve two-year terms. U.S. Senators serve six-year terms.

Federal judges have different terms in office. Article I judges; such as those that sit on the United States bankruptcy courts, United States Tax Court, and United States Court of Appeals for the Armed Forces, and certain other federal courts and other forms of adjudicative bodies serve limited terms: The Court of Appeals for the Armed Forces for 15 years, bankruptcy courts for 14. However, the majority of the federal judiciary, Article III judges (such as those of the Supreme Court, courts of appeal, and federal district courts), serve for life.

=== State and territories ===
The terms of office for officials in state governments varies according to the provisions of state constitutions and state law.

The term for state governors is four years in all states but Vermont and New Hampshire; the Vermont and New Hampshire governors serve for two years.

The National Conference of State Legislatures reported in January 2007 that among state legislatures:

- 44 states had terms of office for the lower house of the state legislature (often termed the state House of Representatives) at two years. Five (Alabama, Louisiana, Maryland, Mississippi, and North Dakota) had terms of office at four years. (The Nebraska Legislature is an exception and has a unicameral legislature with members elected for four years, with staggered elections for half of members.)
- 37 states had terms of office for the upper house of the state legislature (often termed the state Senate) at four years. 20 states had staggered elections for half of the seats in their four-year upper houses, while eight others (Arkansas, Delaware, Florida, Hawaii, Illinois, Minnesota, New Jersey and Texas) were elected on a 2-4-4 schedule, depending on the proximity of the election to legislative reapportionments following the decennial census. Twelve (Arizona, Connecticut, Georgia, Idaho, Maine, Massachusetts, New Hampshire, New York, North Carolina, Rhode Island, South Dakota, Vermont) had terms of office at two years.

Among territories of the United States:

- In the American Samoa Fono, members of the House serve two-year terms while members of the Senate serve six-year terms.
- Members of both chambers of the Legislative Assembly of Puerto Rico have four-year terms.
- Members of both chambers of the Northern Mariana Islands Commonwealth Legislature have two-year terms.
- The Legislature of Guam and Legislature of the Virgin Islands are unicameral and Senators have two-year terms.

Members of Council of the District of Columbia serve a four-year term.

== Canada ==
As a former British territory following the Westminster System, there are many similarities with the United Kingdom, although with some variations based on local customs, the federal system of government and the absentee monarch.

=== Monarch ===
Being a Commonwealth realm, Canada shares a monarch with the United Kingdom and 14 other countries, who serves as head of state of all 15 realms until his or her death or abdication.

=== Viceroys ===
The governor general is appointed by the monarch as his/her personal representative on the advice of the prime minister, and serves for an indefinite term, though the normal convention is 5 years. Similarly, the lieutenant governors, who represent the monarch at the provincial level, are appointed by the governor general on the advice of the prime minister (usually also with consultation of the relevant provincial premier), and generally also serve 5 year terms by convention. The territories have commissioners, who are not representatives of the monarch, but are instead appointed by and represent the governor-in-council (i.e. the federal cabinet), and conventionally serve for about 5 years.

=== House of Commons ===
Similar to the United Kingdom, MPs serve for the duration of the Parliament. They may resign before the end of a Parliament or be elected in by-elections during the middle of a Parliament.

Under the Constitution Act, 1867, a Parliament may last for a maximum of 5 years from the most recent election before expiring, although all Parliaments to date have been dissolved before they could expire. Bill C-16, introduced in the 39th Parliament, provided for fixed election dates every 4 years on the third Monday in October, beginning in 2009. However, the Prime Minister may still advise the Governor General to dissolve Parliament at any time.

As in the United Kingdom, the cabinet and head of government are indirectly elected based on the composition of the House of Commons, they are not technically affected by the terms of legislators or Parliaments. In practice however, the terms of government office holders are affected by changes in the House of Commons, and those who serve for multiple consecutive Parliaments are generally considered to have served a single term. The term of a government generally ends when it is defeated on a confidence matter or the governing party fails to gain enough seats in a general election.

=== Senate ===
Senators are appointed to the Canadian Senate to represent a province, territory, or group of provinces, by the Governor General of Canada on the advice of the Prime Minister, and serve until the mandatory retirement age of 75. Senators appointed before the passage of the British North America Act, 1965 served for life. Senators may also resign from office or be expelled from the Senate.

=== Provincial and Territorial Legislatures ===
Provincial legislatures and the legislature of the Yukon function very similarly to the federal House of Commons. MLAs (called MPPs in Ontario, MNAs in Quebec, and MHAs in Newfoundland and Labrador) serve for the duration of the legislature, though they may resign before the legislature is dissolved or be elected in by-elections between general elections. The legislatures of the Northwest Territories and Nunavut operate using a consensus model, but are similar otherwise. The premiers and their cabinets are selected in the same way as in the House of Commons, and like at the federal level, the term of a provincial government can be ended by defeat in a general election or the loss of the legislature's confidence.

All provincial legislatures have fixed-term election legislation in place, as does the legislature of the Northwest Territories. Premiers may also advise Lieutenant Governors to dissolve legislatures at any time before the prescribed election date.

== Netherlands ==
In the Netherlands the position of Minister-President (Prime Minister) is limited to four years (counted from the moment the government is officially formed) although it can be repeated indefinitely after subsequent elections. It is common for the heads of governments in the Netherlands to take up the mantle multiple times, although it's neither expected or required to do so, more often a consequence of governments breaking up internally before their official four years are over and reforming with other parties. This is how the Netherlands ended up with consequent cabinets by: 4x Willem Drees (Drees-Van Schaik I '48, Drees I '51, Drees II '52 - Drees III '56) 3x Dries van Agt (Van Agt I '77, Van Agt II '81, Van Agt III '82) 4x Jan Peter Balkenende (Balkenende I '02, Balkenende II '03, Balkenende III '06, Balkenende IV '07) 4x Mark Rutte (Rutte I '10, Rutte II '12, Rutte III '17, Rutte IV '22).

== China ==
Between 1982 and 2018, the Constitution of China stipulated that the president, vice president, premier, vice premiers could not serve more than two consecutive terms. In March 2018, China's party-controlled National People's Congress passed a set of constitutional amendments including removal of term limits for the president and vice president, as well as enhancing the central role of the Chinese Communist Party (CCP). On 17 March 2018, the Chinese legislature reappointed Xi as president, now without term limit. According to the Financial Times, Xi expressed his views of constitutional amendment at meetings with Chinese officials and foreign dignitaries. Xi explained the decision in terms of needing to align two more powerful posts—General Secretary of the Chinese Communist Party and Chairman of the Central Military Commission (CMC)—which have no term limits. However, Xi did not say whether he intended to serve as party general secretary, CMC chairman and state president, for three or more terms.

== See also ==
- History of parliamentarism
- Term limits in the United States
- Term limit
- List of political term limits
- Reelection
- Midterm election
