= General election =

Election in which all or most members of a given political body are chosen

A general election is an electoral process to choose most or all members of a governing body at the same time. They are distinct from by-elections, which fill individual seats that have become vacant between general elections. General elections typically occur at regular intervals as mandated by a country's constitution or electoral laws, and may include elections for a legislature and sometimes other positions such as a directly elected president. In many jurisdictions, general elections can coincide with other electoral events such as local, regional, or supranational elections. For example, on 25 May 2014, Belgian voters simultaneously elected their national parliament, 21 members of the European Parliament, and regional parliaments.

In the United States, "general election" has a slightly different, but related meaning: the ordinary electoral competition following the selection of candidates in the primary election.

== United Kingdom ==
The term general election in the United Kingdom often refers to the elections held on the same day in all constituencies of their members of Parliament (MPs) to the House of Commons.

Historically, English and later British general elections took place over a period of several weeks, with individual constituencies holding polling on different days. However, from the 1918 election onwards, the elections in all constituencies have been held on the same day. There has been a convention since the 1930s that general elections in Britain should take place on a Thursday; the last general election to take place on any other weekday was that of 1931.

Under the terms of the Fixed-term Parliaments Act 2011, in force until March 2022, the period between one general election and the next was fixed at five years, unless the House of Commons passed one of the following:

- A motion of no confidence in the Government sooner than that, and did not pass a motion of confidence in a new Government within fourteen days
- A motion, approved by two-thirds of its members, resolving that a general election should take place sooner
- A proposal from the prime minister to reschedule an election mandated by the Act to no later than two months after the original date

Although not provided for in the Fixed-term Parliaments Act, an early election could also be brought about by an act of parliament specifically calling for a general election, which (unlike the second option above) only required a simple majority. This was the mechanism used to precipitate the December 2019 election, when the Early Parliamentary General Election Act 2019 was enacted.

The Fixed-term Parliaments Act was repealed by the Dissolution and Calling of Parliament Act 2022.

The term general election is also used in the United Kingdom to refer to elections to any democratically elected body in which all members are up for election. Section 2 of the Scotland Act 1998, for example, specifically refers to ordinary elections to the Scottish Parliament as general elections.

== United States ==
In U.S. politics, general elections are elections held at any level (e.g. city, county, congressional district, state) that typically involve competition between at least two parties. General elections occur every two to six years (depending on the positions being filled, with most positions good for four years) and include the presidential election. "General election" does not refer to special elections, which fill out positions prematurely vacated by the previous office holder.

Major general elections are as follows:

1. The President and Vice President are elected once every four years (2016, 2020, 2024, 2028, etc.)
2. Representatives in the House of Representatives serve two-year terms, and so there are elections for representatives every two years (midterm elections, and during the same year as the Presidency: 2020, 2022, 2024, 2026, etc.)
3. Senators serve six-year terms, but their terms are staggered. Throughout the US, a third of the senate will be up for election every midterm and during the Presidential election year.

The term general election is distinguished from primaries or caucuses, which are intra-party elections meant to select a party's official candidate for a particular race. Thus, if a primary is meant to elect a party's candidates for a particular position, a general election is meant to elect who occupies the position itself. Presidential primaries happen several months before the general election, though not all states hold primaries.

In the Louisiana the expression general election means the runoff election which occurs between the two highest candidates as determined by the jungle primary.

=== See also ===
- Writ of election
