= Dissolution of the Parliament of the United Kingdom =

British parliamentary procedure

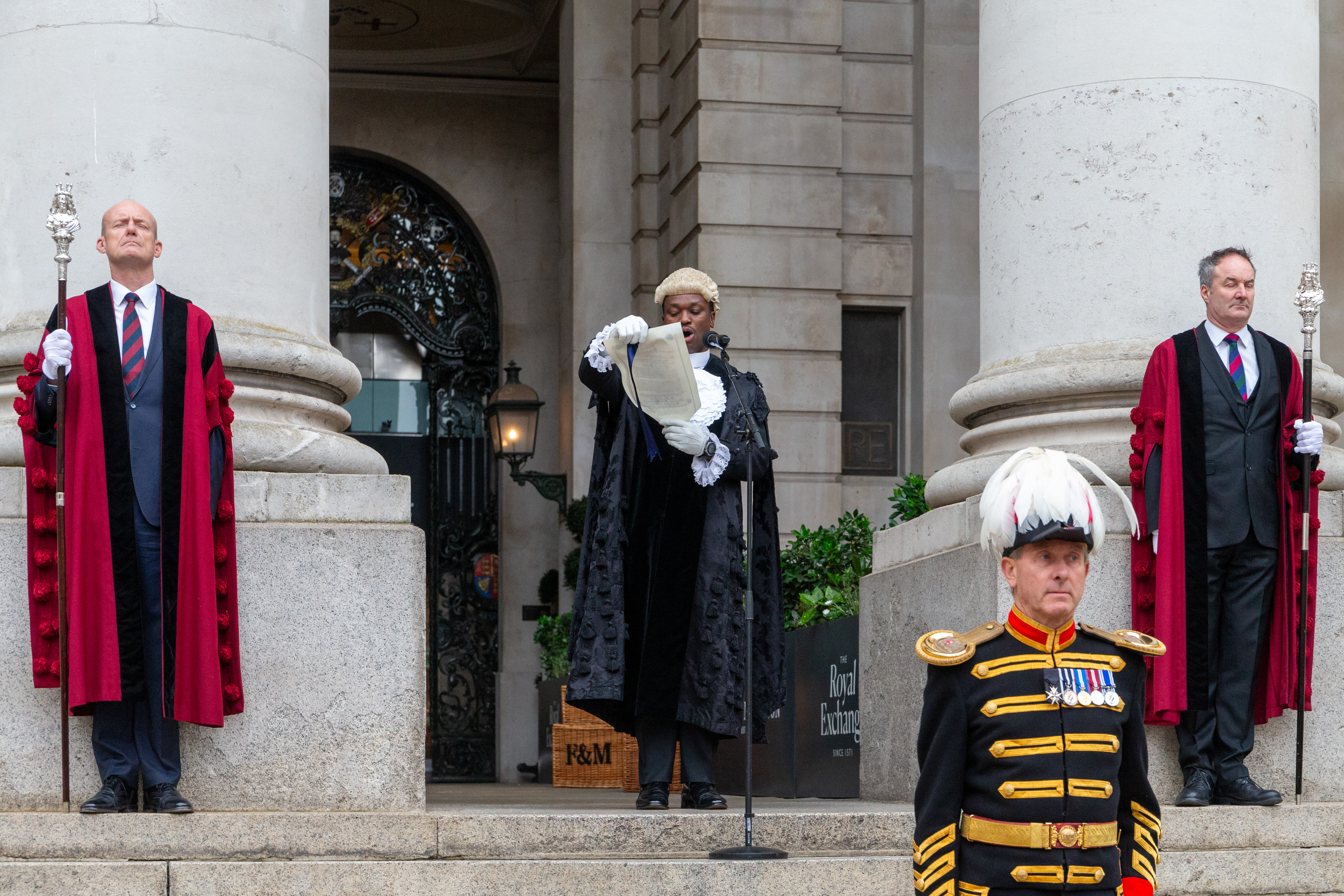
Major Peter Oweh, Common Cryer and Serjeant-at-Arms of the City of London, reading the dissolution proclamation at the Royal Exchange, London, on 31 May 2024

The dissolution of the Parliament of the United Kingdom occurs automatically five years after the day on which Parliament first met following a general election, or on an earlier date by royal proclamation issued by the King-in-Council upon the advice of the prime minister. The monarch's prerogative power to prematurely dissolve Parliament in this way was revived by the Dissolution and Calling of Parliament Act 2022, which also repealed arrangement for five year fixed terms that had been put in place just in 2011. This Act also amended Schedule 1 to the Representation of the People Act 1983, such that the dissolution of Parliament automatically triggers a general election; such elections take place 25 working days after each dissolution.

The last dissolution of Parliament occurred on 30 May 2024, following the prime minister's announcement that a general election was to be held on 4 July 2024.

== Mechanism ==
Parliament is usually prorogued or adjourned before it is dissolved. Parliament may continue to sit for a wash-up period of a few days after the Prime Minister has announced the date when Parliament will be dissolved, to finish some last items of parliamentary business. Business left unresolved after this period will lapse and legislation still in-progress will not become law (unless it is taken up again by the next parliament).

Parliament is dissolved by the British monarch on the Prime Minister's request and advice. After agreeing to the request the King will authorise a proclamation at a Privy Council meeting, which he will then order to be issued under the Great Seal of the Realm.

As soon as Parliament is dissolved, members of Parliament cease to hold office: they may no longer enter the Palace of Westminster, although they and their staff continue to be paid until polling day. Ministers retain their positions as members of the executive government (but not as MPs) until the return of the results of the election and formation of a new government, but during the run up to the election government activity is limited. This caretaker period is designed to maintain the policy status quo, preclude the spending of public funds in a way that would advantage the incumbent government's re-election campaign, and yet allow for the continuation of essential government functions.

Upon one parliament's dissolution, a royal proclamation is made summoning a new parliament. Specifically, it fixes the date when that new Parliament is to assemble, and requires the issuance of writs of summons to the Lords Spiritual and Temporal as well as writs of election for the House of Commons. If Parliament is dissolved by proclamation, the proclamation dissolving it will usually also summon the next one. While it is the royal proclamation, and subsequent Order in Council, which direct the issue of writs of election, the parliamentary election rules direct that a writ is to be deemed to have been received the day after Parliament has been dissolved and that therefore, the general election preparations can begin before the writs are actually received by returning officers. A general election is held 25 working days (a day which is not a weekend nor a bank holiday, nor a day of national mourning or thanksgiving) after Parliament is dissolved.

By tradition, a copy of the royal proclamation is delivered by hand from the Privy Council Office to Mansion House in the City of London. The proclamation is then read out on the steps of the Royal Exchange by the Common Cryer and Serjeant-At-Arms of the City. Similar reading also takes place on the Royal Mile in Edinburgh by the Lord Lyon King of Arms. This tradition was again carried out in May 2024, using the following text.

BY THE KING
A PROCLAMATION FOR DISSOLVING THE PRESENT PARLIAMENT AND DECLARING THE CALLING OF ANOTHER

CHARLES R

Whereas We have thought fit, by and with the advice of Our Privy Council, to dissolve this present Parliament, which stands prorogued to Friday, the thirty-first day of May: We do, for that End, publish this Our Royal Proclamation, and do hereby dissolve the said Parliament accordingly: And the Lords Spiritual and Temporal, and the Members of the House of Commons, are discharged from further Attendance thereat: And We being desirous and resolved, as soon as may be, to meet Our People, and to have their Advice in Parliament, do hereby make known to all Our loving Subjects Our Royal Will and Pleasure to call a new Parliament: and do hereby further declare, that, by and with the advice of Our Privy Council, We have given Order that Our Chancellor of Great Britain and Our Secretary of State for Northern Ireland do respectively, upon Notice thereof, forthwith, issue out Writs, in due Form and according to Law, for calling a new Parliament: And We do hereby also, by this Our Royal Proclamation under Our Great Seal of Our Realm, require Writs forthwith to be issued accordingly by Our said Chancellor and Secretary of State respectively, for causing the Lords Spiritual and Temporal and Commons who are to serve in the said Parliament to be duly returned to, and give their Attendance in, Our said Parliament on Tuesday, the ninth day of July next, which Writs are to be returnable in due course of Law.

Given at Our Court at Buckingham Palace, this thirtieth day of May in the Year of our Lord two thousand and twenty four and in the second year of Our Reign.

GOD SAVE THE KING!

— Proclamation for the dissolution of Parliament made on 30 May 2024

== History ==
Prior to the Triennial Acts of the 1600s, parliaments of England could be summoned and dissolved at the Sovereign's discretion. The Triennial Acts sought to mandate both parliamentary recurrence and regularity of sittings by mandating that gaps between parliaments must not exceed three years. But these Acts did not originally enact provisions for mandated dissolution (ending) of parliaments: there was thus no 'trigger' for the gap limiting provisions to start the 3 year clock, which led to the Long Parliament (formed in 1640 and not dissolved until 1660), and the Cavalier Parliament (sat continuously for the 18 years from 1661–1679). The Triennial Act 1694 completed these early steps toward democratization, setting the maximum duration of a parliament to three years, and requiring mandatory general elections between each parliament. This legislation was carried forward into the Parliament of Great Britain following the ratification of the Acts of Union 1707.

The Septennial Act 1715 increased the maximum length of a parliament from three to seven years, after which time it would automatically expire. This was later amended by the Parliament Act 1911, reducing the maximum term to five years. This could, however, be overridden at the pleasure of Parliament. The length of a parliament has been extended on two occasions since 1911, once during each of the two World Wars.

At any time before this 5 year expiry, a Sovereign can dissolve Parliament and call a general election, however such an action would (in the normal course) only be exercisable on advice, or in other words by the "King-in-Council". This is a constitutional convention which binds the Sovereign, and her/his advisors: they must wait for, and must give, respectively, proper advice. Such advice will in the normal course then be taken (and takeable). Some exceptions probably exist: constitutional experts have opined that the monarch might refuse permission, under the Lascelles Principles, if a Parliament had more than a year still to run and if another person (other than the PM, say the Leader of the Opposition) could potentially command a majority in the House of Commons. In such a (rare) case, the monarch could commission that other person to act as prime minister, who would then be able to proffer advice on the matter of dissolution.

Prior to 1918, it was the Cabinet which collectively sought permission from the monarch in order for Parliament to be dissolved. However, since 1918, the Prime Minister alone has sought the permission of the Sovereign. In practice, this means that a Prime Minister with a Commons majority and the continuing support of that majority has a de facto substantive authority to determine and advise that the Parliament should be dissolved at whatever time—at least whatever time toward the end of the 5 year term—she or he chooses. This gives prime ministers and incumbent governments a considerable strategic advantage (over the opposition) in terms of the timing of elections, and in preparing for them (given the prime minister will have earlier knowledge of the election date than anyone else).

=== Summary of historical term lengths of the Parliament of the United Kingdom ===
Year (from)	Term (years)	Act	Notes
1707	3 (maximum)	Ratification of the Acts of Union	Formation of the Parliament of Great Britain.
1715	7 (maximum)	Septennial Act 1715	Maximum 7-year duration of Parliament. Parliament to be dissolved before the seventh anniversary of its first sitting.
1801	7 (maximum)	Acts of Union 1800	Formation of the Parliament of the United Kingdom.
1911	5 (maximum)	Parliament Act 1911	Maximum 5-year duration of Parliament instituted. Parliament to be dissolved before the fifth anniversary of its first sitting.
1916	8	Parliament and Registration Act 1916	Extended Parliament until December 1918 (ad hoc).
1940 (during Second World War)	10	Various Acts of Parliament	Maximum 5-year duration of Parliament extended by Prolongation of Parliament Act 1940, Prolongation of Parliament Act 1941, Prolongation of Parliament Act 1942, Prolongation of Parliament Act 1943, and Prolongation of Parliament Act 1944. Each of these Acts extended the maximum duration of the then extant Parliament for an additional year.
1945 (post-WW2)	5 (maximum)		Maximum 5-year duration of Parliament. Parliament to be dissolved before the fifth anniversary of its first sitting.
2011	5	Fixed-term Parliaments Act 2011	Five-year interval between ordinary general elections. General elections were scheduled to take place on the first Thursday in May in every fifth year or the first Thursday in May on the fourth year if the previous election took place before the first Thursday in May, unless specific situations allowing for early dissolution had arisen (government had lost confidence of house, or motion for an early election carried by it).
2022	5 (maximum)	Dissolution and Calling of Parliament Act 2022	Restored ability of PM to seek early election. Parliament automatically dissolves at the beginning of the day which is the fifth anniversary of the day on which it first met, unless dissolved earlier.

=== Fixed-term Parliaments Act 2011 ===
Fixed term parliaments were introduced by the Fixed-term Parliaments Act 2011 ("FTPA") following the Conservative–Liberal Democrat coalition agreement promulgated after the 2010 election, thereby repealing the Septennial Act 1715 and abolishing the ability of the Prime Minister unilaterally to request an election prior to the expiry of the five-year term. Under this new set of quasi-constitutional rules, general elections were to be held at fixed intervals and Parliament was to be dissolved 17 (later changed to 25) working days before the polling day for the next general election. The date for the next general election could be brought forward if the House of Commons passed a motion of no confidence in the Government or passed a motion for an early general election with a two-thirds majority. Strictly speaking, this was not a fixed term (as it is in the Riksdag of Sweden or the Scottish Parliament), but only a semi-fixed term, since a parliament elected after an early dissolution was chosen for a full five-year period (rather than serving out the residual of the prior parliamentary term). The FTPA did not affect the Sovereign's power to prorogue Parliament.

Under the FTPA, writs of election were issued to the returning officers of each constituency automatically (section 3(3)). Concomitantly, the royal proclamation no longer commanded the holding of the election per se, but only the meeting of the new Parliament.

Parliament was dissolved automatically due to the expiration of its term (as opposed to being dissolved by royal proclamation) for the first time on 30 March 2015. Although Prime Minister David Cameron met the Queen on the day of the dissolution, the only business discussed was the calling of the new Parliament, and not a request for a dissolution, as had happened at every such meeting historically. The subsequent royal proclamation (also dated 30 March) simply called for the holding of the next Parliament. At the 2015 general election, the period between the dissolution of the previous Parliament and the meeting of the new Parliament was the longest period the United Kingdom had been without a Parliament since 1924.

The 2017 general election was called by virtue of a motion for an early general election under the FTPA. The motion was passed in the House of Commons with a vote of 522 to 13.

In accordance with the provisions of the Early Parliamentary General Election Act 2019, Parliament was dissolved but this time without the passing of a motion under the provisions of section 2(2) of the FTPA (then the default mechanism for dissolving parliament prior to the expiration of its term). This 2019 Act instead itself fixed the polling day for the next general election: 12 December 2019. This caused Parliament to be dissolved, by operation of section 3(1) of the FTPA, on 6 November. Thus for a time parliament, not the government or the prime minister, determined the date of its own dissolution. This was a historical curiosity, and it was not to continue.

=== Dissolution and Calling of Parliament Act 2022 ===
In December 2020, the Conservative government published a draft bill to repeal the 2011 arrangements, and revert back to the position prior to the FTPA. This legislation, the Dissolution and Calling of Parliament Act 2022, was introduced to the House of Commons in May 2021, and given royal assent on 24 March 2022. It repealed the 2011 FTPAct in its entirety, restored the monarch's prerogative powers to dissolve Parliament upon the prime minister's advice/request, and ensured (as a default) that a parliamentary term automatically ends five years after its first meeting, with the poll to be held 25 working days after such dissolution, whether it dissolved by simple expiry or by royal action. The first dissolution of a parliament under these reverted arrangements took place as per the prime minister's advice, on 30 May 2024, following parliamentary prorogation six days earlier; an election was held on schedule on 4 July 2024.
