= 2011 Horsham District Council election =

2011 UK local government election

- 5 May 2011

All 44 seats to Horsham District Council 23 seats needed for a majority
	First party	Second party	Third party
Party	Conservative	Liberal Democrats	Independent
Seats won	34	8	2
Seat change	▲3	▼3	Steady
- Results of the 2011 Horsham District Council election

The 2011 Horsham District Council election took place on 5 May 2011 to elect members of Horsham District Council in England. It was held on the same day as other local elections and the 2011 United Kingdom Alternative Vote referendum. The Conservatives increased their majority on the council to 12, winning a total of 34 seats.

== Council composition ==
Prior to the election, the composition of the council was:

↓
31	11	2
Con	LDem	Ind

After the election, the composition of the council was:

↓
34	8	2
Con	LDem	Ind

== Results summary ==
2011 Horsham District Council election
Party	Seats	Gains	Losses	Net gain/loss	Seats %	Votes %	Votes	+/−
Conservative	34	4	1	▲3	77.3	56.4	51,157	+2.1
Liberal Democrats	8	1	4	▼3	18.2	24.4	22,114	-12.4
Independent	2	0	0	Steady	4.5	3.7	3,376	+0.5
Labour	0	–	–	Steady	0.0	7.2	6,533	+5.6
UKIP	0	-	-	Steady	0.0	6.8	6,190	+3.9
Green	0	–	–	Steady	0.0	1.1	1,022	+0.8
Peace	0	–	–	Steady	0.0	0.3	266	0.0

== Ward results ==
=== Billingshurst and Shipley ===
Billingshurst and Shipley
Party	Candidate	Votes	%	±%
Conservative	Adam Breacher	1,467	42.3	−5.6
Conservative	Gordon Lindsay	1,414		
Conservative	Kathleen Rowbottom	1,360		
UKIP	Douglas Rands	601	17.3	−0.2
Liberal Democrats	Gillian Knight	568	16.4	−18.1
UKIP	David Duke	561		
UKIP	Graham Harper	441		
Labour	John Box	421	12.1	+12.1
Liberal Democrats	Erica Lee	414		
Independent	Roy Margetts	409	11.8	+11.8
Liberal Democrats	Philip Seth	385		
Labour	Keith Maslin	351		
Turnout			44.5	
Conservative hold		Swing		
Conservative hold		Swing		
Conservative hold		Swing		

=== Bramber, Upper Beeding and Woodmancote ===
Bramber, Upper Beeding and Woodmancote
Party	Candidate	Votes	%	±%
Conservative	James Goddard	974	44.4	−4.1
Conservative	David Coldwell	938		
Liberal Democrats	Andrew Purches	770	35.1	−10.0
Liberal Democrats	Jessica Sproxton-Miller	518		
Labour	Adrian Norridge	236	10.8	+4.4
UKIP	Stuart Bower	212	9.7	+9.7
Turnout			49.1	
Conservative hold		Swing		
Conservative hold		Swing		

=== Broadbridge Heath ===
Broadbridge Heath
Party	Candidate	Votes	%	±%
Liberal Democrats	Malcolm Curnock	391	37.9	−26.0
Conservative	Linda Pettitt	385	37.3	+1.2
Labour	Raymond Chapman	164	15.9	+15.9
UKIP	Valerie Gray	91	8.8	+8.8
Turnout			44.4	
Liberal Democrats hold		Swing		

=== Chanctonbury ===
Chanctonbury
Party	Candidate	Votes	%	±%
Conservative	Philip Circus	1,851	57.1	−7.6
Conservative	Roger Arthur	1,789		
Conservative	Eric Jenkins	1,786		
Liberal Democrats	Richard Martin	550	17.0	−4.9
Labour	Susan Shord	427	13.2	+13.2
UKIP	Jean Westrip	414	12.8	−0.6
Turnout			49.0	
Conservative hold		Swing		
Conservative hold		Swing		
Conservative hold		Swing		

=== Chantry ===
Chantry
Party	Candidate	Votes	%	±%
Conservative	Christopher Mason	2,507	54.5	−4.3
Conservative	Raymond Dawe	2,495		
Conservative	James Sanson	2,265		
Liberal Democrats	Hugh Addy	836	18.2	−6.1
Labour	Margaret Cornwell	661	14.4	+14.4
UKIP	Peter Westrip	592	12.9	−4.0
Turnout			49.9	
Conservative hold		Swing		
Conservative hold		Swing		
Conservative hold		Swing		

=== Cowfold, Shermanbury and West Grinstead ===
Cowfold, Shermanbury and West Grinstead
Party	Candidate	Votes	%	±%
Conservative	Jonathan Chowen	1,242	66.4	−7.8
Conservative	Andrew Dunlop	1,127		
Liberal Democrats	Jonathan Dittmer	628	33.6	+7.8
Turnout			39.7	
Conservative hold		Swing		
Conservative hold		Swing		

=== Denne ===
Denne
Party	Candidate	Votes	%	±%
Conservative	Laurence Deakins	854	38.9	+3.7
Liberal Democrats	David Sheldon	816	37.1	−11.4
Conservative	Ronald Vimpany	630		
Liberal Democrats	Alessandro Mancini	588		
Labour	Jane Field	309	14.1	+8.2
UKIP	Martin Bridewell	218	9.9	+9.9
Turnout			45.1	
Conservative gain from Liberal Democrats		Swing		
Liberal Democrats hold		Swing		

=== Forest ===
Forest
Party	Candidate	Votes	%	±%
Liberal Democrats	Godfrey Newman	976	53.0	+5.3
Conservative	David Scozzafava	667	36.2	−12.4
Labour	Josephine Battersby	121	6.6	+2.9
UKIP	Harry Aldridge	78	4.2	+4.2
Turnout			62.3	
Liberal Democrats gain from Conservative		Swing		

=== Henfield ===
Henfield
Party	Candidate	Votes	%	±%
Independent	Sheila Matthews	1,133	35.2	−6.7
Conservative	Brian O'Connell	986	30.8	−6.2
Independent	Matthew Brookbank	428	13.4	+13.4
Liberal Democrats	Andrew Sharp	398	12.4	−8.7
Labour	Mark Boorsma	262	8.2	+8.2
Turnout			51.5	
Independent hold		Swing		
Conservative hold		Swing		

=== Holbrook East ===
Holbrook East
Party	Candidate	Votes	%	±%
Conservative	Andrew Baldwin	1,295	60.3	+4.0
Conservative	James Rae	1,050		
Liberal Democrats	Warwick Hellawell	428	19.9	−17.3
Liberal Democrats	Gregory Collins	417		
Labour	Linda Hugl	289	13.4	+13.4
UKIP	Micheal Smith	137	6.4	+6.4
Turnout			48.8	
Conservative hold		Swing		
Conservative hold		Swing		

=== Holbrook West ===
Holbrook West
Party	Candidate	Votes	%	±%
Conservative	Peter Burgess	1,174	54.1	+7.2
Conservative	Christian Mitchell	1,151		
Liberal Democrats	Valerie Newman	547	25.2	−7.6
Liberal Democrats	Belinda Walters	541		
Labour	Sheila Chapman	283	13.0	+9.4
UKIP	Sally Wilkins	168	7.7	+7.7
Turnout			48.3	
Conservative hold		Swing		
Conservative hold		Swing		

Peter Burgess stood as an independent in Holbrook West in 2007, the year when this seat was last contested.

=== Horsham Park ===
Horsham Park
Party	Candidate	Votes	%	±%
Liberal Democrats	David Holmes	876	32.6	−16.2
Conservative	Josh Murphy	798	29.7	+0.9
Liberal Democrats	Frances Haigh	785		
Conservative	Lauren Proctor	759		
Conservative	Connor Relleen	712		
Liberal Democrats	Roberto Nacci	564		
Labour	Carol Hayton	507	18.9	+6.2
Labour	Jonathan Austin	499		
Labour	David Hide	437		
Peace	Jim Duggan	266	9.9	+0.2
UKIP	Nigel Smith	240	8.9	+8.9
Turnout			43.0	
Liberal Democrats hold		Swing		
Conservative gain from Liberal Democrats		Swing		
Liberal Democrats hold		Swing		

=== Itchingfield, Slinfold and Warnham ===
Itchingfield, Slinfold and Warnham
Party	Candidate	Votes	%	±%
Conservative	Robert Nye	1,303	51.8	−0.5
Conservative	Patricia Youtan	898		
Liberal Democrats	Ian Shepherd	569	22.6	−14.5
Green	Justin Pickard	366	14.6	+14.6
UKIP	George Tribe	276	11.0	+0.4
Turnout			49.1	
Conservative hold		Swing		
Conservative hold		Swing		

=== Nuthurst ===
Nuthurst
Party	Candidate	Votes	%	±%
Conservative	Duncan England	862	68.7	−4.7
Liberal Democrats	Peter Mullarkey	258	20.6	+2.3
UKIP	Adam Bufton	135	10.8	+10.8
Turnout			55.6	
Conservative hold		Swing		

=== Pulborough and Coldwatham ===
Pulborough and Coldwatham
Party	Candidate	Votes	%	±%
Conservative	Brian Donnelly	1,329	52.6	−24.1
Conservative	Roger Paterson	1,253		
Green	Peter Alison	368	14.6	+14.6
UKIP	Peter Lee	323	12.8	+12.8
Liberal Democrats	Susan Stokes	269	10.6	−12.7
UKIP	John Wallace	241		
Labour	Jill Allen	240	9.5	+9.5
Turnout			44.7	
Conservative hold		Swing		
Conservative hold		Swing		

=== Roffey North ===
Roffey North
Party	Candidate	Votes	%	±%
Conservative	Helena Croft	999	39.4	+4.0
Liberal Democrats	David Skipp	932	36.8	−16.1
Liberal Democrats	Nicholas Butler	748		
Conservative	Mikko Figura	694		
Labour	Nicholas Field	324	12.8	+12.8
UKIP	Micheal Rowlands	278	11.0	+11.0
Turnout			47.3	
Conservative gain from Liberal Democrats		Swing		
Liberal Democrats hold		Swing		

=== Roffey South ===
Roffey South
Party	Candidate	Votes	%	±%
Conservative	Roy Cornell	934	45.0	−0.4
Conservative	Simon Torn	914		
Liberal Democrats	Phyllis Rutherford	625	30.1	−13.8
Liberal Democrats	Roger Wilton	586		
Labour	Raymond Battersby	297	14.3	+3.6
UKIP	David Buck	218	10.5	+10.5
Turnout			41.8	
Conservative hold		Swing		
Conservative gain from Liberal Democrats		Swing		

=== Rudgwick ===
Rudgwick
Party	Candidate	Votes	%	±%
Conservative	John Bailey	662	60.7	−16.0
Liberal Democrats	Laurence Price	229	21.0	+1.6
UKIP	Albert Stevens	200	18.3	+18.3
Turnout			55.3	
Conservative hold		Swing		

=== Rusper and Colgate ===
Rusper and Colgate
Party	Candidate	Votes	%	±%
Conservative	Elizabeth Kitchen	713	73.7	−1.8
Liberal Democrats	Anthony Millson	146	15.1	+1.2
UKIP	Stuart Aldridge	109	11.3	+11.3
Turnout			48.3	
Conservative hold		Swing		

=== Southwater ===
Southwater
Party	Candidate	Votes	%	±%
Conservative	Ian Howard	1,857	54.2	−0.4
Conservative	Claire Vickers	1,806		
Conservative	John Chidlow	1,721		
Liberal Democrats	Peter Stainton	1,073	31.3	−14.1
Liberal Democrats	Kirstin Turner	834		
Liberal Democrats	Alan Belmore	666		
UKIP	Bryan Bufton	495	14.5	+14.5
Turnout			44.7	
Conservative hold		Swing		
Conservative hold		Swing		
Conservative hold		Swing		

=== Steyning ===
Steyning
Party	Candidate	Votes	%	±%
Independent	George Cockman	1,406	39.1	+7.1
Conservative	Susan Rogers	1,059	29.4	−3.9
Conservative	David Barling	961		
Liberal Democrats	Nicholas Hopkinson	857	23.8	−5.8
Labour	Antony Bignell	274	7.6	+2.6
Turnout			43.9	
Independent hold		Swing		
Conservative hold		Swing		

=== Trafalgar ===
Trafalgar
Party	Candidate	Votes	%	±%
Liberal Democrats	Christine Costin	1,210	45.7	−7.8
Liberal Democrats	Leonard Crosbie	1,116		
Conservative	Keith Bridgeman	895	33.8	+6.1
Labour	Alexandra Davis	239	9.0	+3.2
Labour	Jacqueline Little	192		
UKIP	Claire Bridewell	162	6.1	+0.8
Green	Nicholas Fitter	144	5.4	−2.1
Green	Stacey Frier	144		
Turnout			53.2	
Liberal Democrats hold		Swing		
Liberal Democrats hold		Swing		
