= Writ of election =

Official writ calling for an election

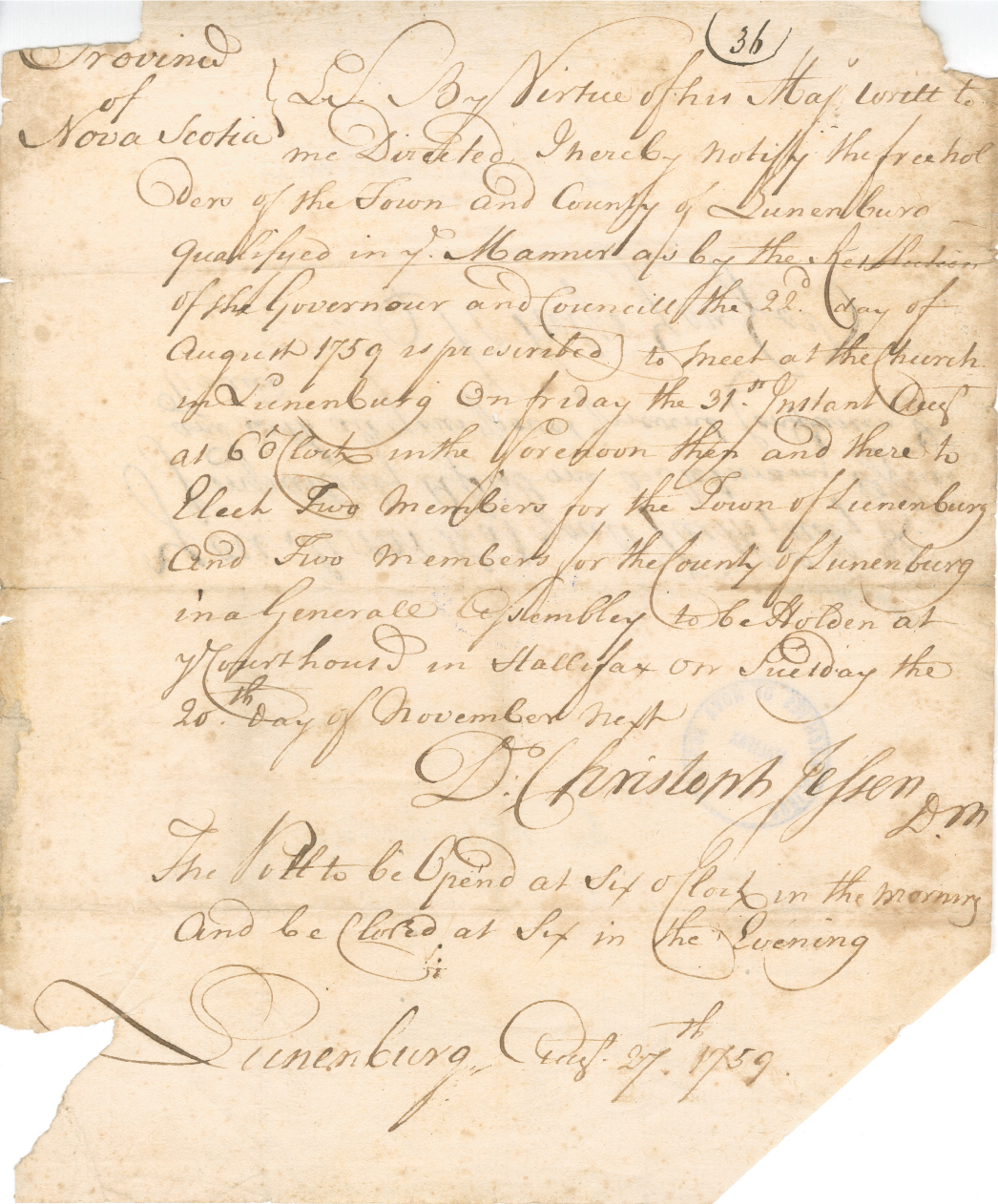
Election writ issued by the provost marshal to freeholders of Lunenburg, Nova Scotia, 1759

A writ of election is a writ issued ordering the holding of an election. In Commonwealth countries writs are the usual mechanism by which by-elections are called and are issued by the head of state or their representative. In the United States, writs are more commonly used to call special elections for political offices.

In some countries, especially in Canada, the process of issuing writs of election is referred to as "dropping the writ", likely derived from the phrase "drawing up the writ".

In some parliamentary systems, the head of government (e.g. prime minister or premier) advises the head of state to issue writs of election (typically following the dissolution of parliament in order to hold general elections, but also for by-elections). The head of state usually reserves the right to refuse the request, in which case the head of government is required by convention or statute to resign. For example, in the case of a minority government, the head of state can deny the request for dissolution and ask the leader of another parliamentary party to form a government. In some cases, such as with the president of Ireland, there are specific limitations on when a head of state can refuse the request. Even then, the right is rarely exercised, as it is likely to precipitate a constitutional crisis (see, for example, the Canadian King–Byng Affair of 1926).

== Timing ==
Usually, according to parliamentary law, the head of government must regularly call an election but it is otherwise within their discretion when to drop the writ, up to the time when the parliament has served its full term. At that point, an election must be called by issuing the writs. An exception to this principle is if a fixed-term election law has been enacted.

In some states and territories of Australia, such as New South Wales, Victoria, South Australia, and the Australian Capital Territory, it is normally required by law that the parliament must run its full term before issuing the writs. Early dissolutions are allowed by the governor (NSW, Vic, SA) or federal minister for territories (ACT) only if certain objective criteria are met – in particular, if the parliament is unable to agree on the annual budget. Similarly, in New Zealand, it is the norm for parliament to run full term (or very close to full term) unless the prime minister cannot govern or feels they must bring an important issue before the nation.

Opposition parties can bring down the government by passing a motion of no confidence, in which the prime minister is required by convention or specific law to either drop the writ or resign; parliaments do not have the right to force the prime minister to drop the writ.

== Practice by country ==
=== Australia ===
In Australia, writs for election are issued by the governor-general for the House of Representatives within 10 days of the dissolution or expiration of the House and by the state governors for the election of senators for their respective states, while writs for the election of territory senators are issued by the governor-general. State governors also issue writs for elections of their respective state parliaments and election of the Senators representing their state in the Australian Senate.

The writs are issued to the relevant electoral officer or returning officer, as the case may be, who returns them after the election has been held within a fixed period.

=== Canada ===
In Canada, a writ is the only way of holding an election for the House of Commons. When the government wants to or, is required to, dissolve Parliament, a writ of election is drawn up for each riding (electoral district) in Canada by the chief electoral officer. They are then formally issued by the governor general. Similarly where a single riding becomes vacant, a writ is issued to trigger the by-election for that seat. A writ with the name of the successful candidate noted on its back will be returned to the chief electoral officer.

==== "Dropping the writ" ====
An informal term used in Canada to describe the issuing of writs of election is "dropping the writ". The usage of the word drop in this context is likely derived from the phrase "draw up". Although it is still considered stylistically inappropriate by some, who assert that the correct phrase is "the writs are issued", or the "writs are drawn up", the term has been recorded in academic text.

=== New Zealand ===
In New Zealand, the Electoral Act 1993 mandates that, following the dissolution of Parliament, the governor-general signs only a single writ instructing the Electoral Commission to hold a general election. After the general election has been held, the writ is returned to the clerk of the House of Representatives with the names of all successful candidates who have been elected to electorate seats. A writ will also be issued when a by-election is held.

=== Singapore ===
In Singapore, a writ of election issued by the prime minister for presidential elections, and the president for parliamentary general elections. Writs are issued under the public seal of Singapore.

=== United Kingdom ===
In the United Kingdom, a writ is the only way of holding an election for the House of Commons. When the government wants to, or is required to, dissolve Parliament, a writ of election is drawn up for each constituency in the UK by the clerk of the Crown in Chancery. They are then formally issued by the monarch. (When the Fixed-term Parliaments Act 2011 was in effect, writs were issued by the lord chancellor.)

Where a single constituency becomes vacant, a writ is issued by the speaker of the House of Commons to trigger the by-election for that seat.

After the election has been held in a constituency, the acting returning officer must write the name of the winning candidate on the writ and return it to the clerk of the Crown.

=== United States ===
In the United States, this writ is issued mainly by state governors for filling vacancies in the United States House of Representatives, the United States Senate, or the states' own legislatures.
