= Elections in England =

Political elections for public offices in England

There are five types of elections in England: elections to the House of Commons of the United Kingdom, elections to the devolved London Assembly, local council elections, metro mayor elections, and the Police and crime commissioner elections, in addition to by-elections for each aforementioned election. Elections are held on Election Day, which is conventionally a Thursday.

Under the Fixed-term Parliaments Act 2011, all five types of elections are held after fixed periods, though early elections to the UK parliament occurred in both 2017 and 2019. After winning the 2019 election, the Conservative Party committed to repealing the FTPA. On 1 December 2020, in fulfilment of this manifesto pledge, the government published a draft Fixed-term Parliaments Act 2011 (Repeal) Bill, which would repeal the FTPA and revive the royal prerogative power of dissolving Parliament as it existed before the Act. The legislation was formally announced as the Dissolution and Calling of Parliament Bill in the Queen's Speech of 11 May 2021, and granted Royal Assent on 24 March 2022.

The three electoral systems used for elections in England are: first-past-the-post (for UK elections and local elections, though individual local authorities are able to move to STV under recent legislation), the additional member system (for Mayor and London Assembly elections) and the supplementary vote (for Police and Crime Commissioner elections; although proposals by the UK Government to change Assembly, Mayor and PCC elections to FPTP have been made).

== UK Parliament ==
Since 1918, the Conservative Party has predominantly received the most English votes in UK general elections, winning a plurality 21 times out of 29. The other seven elections (1945, 1950, 1951, 1966, October 1974, 1997, 2001 and 2024) saw the popular vote in England being won by the Labour Party.

=== 1918 ===
| Party | Seats | | | | | Votes | | |
| Party | Total | Gains | Losses | Net ± | % seats | Total votes | % votes | Change |
|---|---|---|---|---|---|---|---|---|
| Conservative | 315 | N/A | | | 65.0 | ~3,140,000 | 39.5 | N/A |
| Liberal | 107 | N/A | | | 22.1 | ~2,140,000 | 26.4 | N/A |
| Labour | 42 | N/A | | | 8.7 | ~1,810,000 | 22.5 | N/A |
| Other parties | 21 | N/A | | | 2.5 | ~690,000 | 8.5 | N/A |
| | 485 | N/A | | | 100 | ~8,050,000 | 100 | N/A |

=== 1922 ===
| Party | Seats | | | | | Votes | | |
| Party | Total | Gains | Losses | Net ± | % seats | Total votes | % votes | Change |
|---|---|---|---|---|---|---|---|---|
| Conservative | 307 | N/A | | ▼8 | 63.3 | ~4,810,000 | 41.1 | N/A |
| Labour | 95 | N/A | | ▲43 | 19.6 | ~3,370,000 | 28.8 | N/A |
| Liberal | 75 | N/A | | ▼32 | 15.5 | ~3,210,000 | 27.2 | N/A |
| Other parties | 8 | N/A | | ▼13 | 1.6 | ~310,000 | 2.5 | N/A |
| | 485 | N/A | | | 100 | ~11,700,000 | 100 | N/A |

=== 1923 ===
| Party | Seats | | | | | Votes | | |
| Party | Total | Gains | Losses | Net ± | % seats | Total votes | % votes | Change |
|---|---|---|---|---|---|---|---|---|
| Conservative | 221 | N/A | | ▼86 | 45.6 | ~4,730,000 | 39.8 | N/A |
| Labour | 138 | N/A | | ▲43 | 28.5 | ~3,550,000 | 29.7 | N/A |
| Liberal | 123 | N/A | | ▲48 | 25.4 | ~3,570,000 | 29.9 | N/A |
| Other parties | 3 | N/A | | ▼5 | 0.62 | ~70,000 | 0.6 | N/A |
| | 485 | N/A | | | 100 | ~11,930,000 | 100 | N/A |

=== 1924 ===
| Party | Seats | | | | | Votes | | |
| Party | Total | Gains | Losses | Net ± | % seats | Total votes | % votes | Change |
|---|---|---|---|---|---|---|---|---|
| Conservative | 347 | N/A | | ▲126 | 71.5 | ~6,460,000 | 47.7 | N/A |
| Labour | 109 | N/A | | ▼29 | 22.4 | ~4,470,000 | 32.8 | N/A |
| Liberal | 19 | N/A | | ▼104 | 3.9 | ~3,390,000 | 17.6 | N/A |
| Other parties | 10 | N/A | | ▲7 | 1.9 | ~250,000 | 0.6 | N/A |
| | 485 | N/A | | | 100 | ~13,560,000 | 100 | N/A |

=== 1929 ===
| Party | Seats | | | | | Votes | | |
| Party | Total | Gains | Losses | Net ± | % seats | Total votes | % votes | Change |
|---|---|---|---|---|---|---|---|---|
| Labour | 226 | N/A | | ▲117 | 46.6 | ~6,850,000 | 36.9 | N/A |
| Conservative | 221 | N/A | | ▼126 | 45.5 | ~7,180,000 | 38.8 | N/A |
| Liberal | 35 | N/A | | ▲16 | 7.2 | ~4,340,000 | 23.6 | N/A |
| Other parties | 3 | N/A | | ▼7 | 2.0 | ~130,000 | 0.7 | N/A |
| | 485 | N/A | | | 100 | ~18,500,000 | 100 | N/A |

=== 1931 ===
| Party | Seats | | | | | Votes | | |
| Party | Total | Gains | Losses | Net ± | % seats | Total votes | % votes | Change |
|---|---|---|---|---|---|---|---|---|
| Conservative | 436 | N/A | | ▲215 | 89.9 | ~11,480,000 | 63.3 | N/A |
| Labour | 29 | N/A | | ▼197 | 5.98 | ~7,180,000 | 30.2 | N/A |
| Liberal | 19 | N/A | | ▼16 | 3.91 | ~1,040,000 | 6.0 | N/A |
| Other parties | 1 | N/A | | ▼2 | 0.2 | ~100,000 | 0.5 | N/A |
| | 485 | N/A | | | 100 | ~18,080,000 | 100 | N/A |

=== 1935 ===
| Party | Seats | | | | | Votes | | |
| Party | Total | Gains | Losses | Net ± | % seats | Total votes | % votes | Change |
|---|---|---|---|---|---|---|---|---|
| Conservative | 357 | N/A | | ▼81 | 73.6 | ~9,990,000 | 54.5 | N/A |
| Labour | 116 | N/A | | ▲87 | 23.9 | ~7,050,000 | 38.5 | N/A |
| Liberal | 11 | N/A | | ▼16 | 2.26 | ~1,110,000 | 6.3 | N/A |
| Other parties | 1 | N/A | | ▼2 | 0.2 | ~120,000 | 0.7 | N/A |
| | 485 | N/A | | | 100 | ~18,270,000 | 100 | N/A |

=== 1945 ===
| Party | Seats | | | Votes | | |
| Party | Total | Net ± | % seats | Total votes | % votes | Change |
|---|---|---|---|---|---|---|
| Labour | 331 | ▲215 | 64.9 | ~9,970,000 | 48.5 | ▲10.0% |
| Conservative | 167 | ▼190 | 32.7 | ~8,270,000 | 40.2 | ▼14.5% |
| Liberal | 5 | ▼6 | 0.98 | ~1,910,000 | 9.4 | ▲3.1% |
| Other parties | 7 | ▲6 | 1.37 | ~380,000 | 1.9 | |
| | 510 | | 100 | ~20,540,000 | 100 | |

=== 1950 ===
| Party | Seats | | | Votes | | |
| Party | Total | Net ± | % seats | Total votes | % votes | Change |
|---|---|---|---|---|---|---|
| Labour | 251 | ▼80 | 49.6 | ~11,050,000 | 46.1 | ▼2.4 % |
| Conservative | 253 | ▲68 | 50.0 | ~10,500,000 | 43.8 | ▲3.6 % |
| Liberal | 2 | ▼3 | 0.39 | ~2,250,000 | 9.4 | Steady |
| | 506 | | 100 | ~23,950,000 | 100 | |

=== 1951 ===
| Party | Seats | | | Votes | | |
| Party | Total | Net ± | % seats | Total votes | % votes | Change |
|---|---|---|---|---|---|---|
| Conservative | 271 | ▲20 | 53.5 | ~11,620,000 | 48.76 | ▲4.9% |
| Labour | 233 | ▼20 | 48.8 | ~11,630,000 | 48.80 | ▲2.7% |
| Liberal | 2 | Steady | 0.39 | ~530,000 | 2.2 | ▼7.1% |
| | 506 | | 100 | ~23,830,000 | 100 | |

=== 1955 ===
| Party | Seats | | | Votes | | |
| Party | Total | Net ± | % seats | Total votes | % votes | Change |
|---|---|---|---|---|---|---|
| Conservative | 293 | ▲22 | 57.3 | ~11,170,000 | 50.4 | ▲1.6% |
| Labour | 216 | ▼17 | 42.3 | ~10,360,000 | 46.8 | ▼2.0% |
| Liberal | 2 | Steady | 0.39 | ~570,000 | 2.7 | ▲0.5% |
| | 511 | | 100 | ~22,140,000 | 100 | |

=== 1959 ===
| Party | Seats | | | Votes | | |
| Party | Total | Net ± | % seats | Total votes | % votes | Change |
|---|---|---|---|---|---|---|
| Conservative | 315 | ▲22 | 61.6 | ~11,560,000 | 50.0 | ▼0.4% |
| Labour | 193 | ▼23 | 37.7 | ~10,090,000 | 43.6 | ▼3.2% |
| Liberal | 3 | ▲1 | 0.59 | ~1,450,000 | 6.3 | ▲3.6% |
| | 511 | | 100 | ~23,130,000 | 100 | |

=== 1964 ===
| Party | Seats | | | Votes | | |
| Party | Total | Net ± | % seats | Total votes | % votes | Change |
|---|---|---|---|---|---|---|
| Labour | 246 | ▲53 | 48.1 | ~9,980,000 | 43.5 | ▼0.1% |
| Conservative | 262 | ▼53 | 51.2 | ~10,110,000 | 44.1 | ▼5.9% |
| Liberal | 3 | Steady | 0.59 | ~2,780,000 | 12.1 | ▲5.8% |
| | 511 | | 100 | ~22,940,000 | 100 | |

=== 1966 ===
| Party | Seats | | | Votes | | |
| Party | Total | Net ± | % seats | Total votes | % votes | Change |
|---|---|---|---|---|---|---|
| Labour | 285 | ▲39 | 55.8 | ~10,890,000 | 48.0 | ▲4.5% |
| Conservative | 219 | ▼43 | 42.8 | ~9,690,000 | 42.7 | ▼1.4% |
| Liberal | 6 | ▲3 | 1.17 | ~2,040,000 | 9.0 | ▼3.1% |
| | 511 | | 100 | ~22,690,000 | 100 | |

=== 1970 ===
| Party | Seats | | | Votes | | |
| Party | Total | Net ± | % seats | Total votes | % votes | Change |
|---|---|---|---|---|---|---|
| Conservative | 292 | ▲73 | 57.1 | ~11,280,000 | 48.3 | ▲5.6% |
| Labour | 216 | ▼69 | 42.2 | ~10,130,000 | 43.4 | ▼4.6% |
| Liberal | 2 | ▼4 | 0.39 | ~1,850,000 | 7.9 | ▼1.1% |
| | 511 | | 100 | ~23,360,000 | 100 | |

=== February 1974 ===
| Party | Seats | | | Votes | | |
| Party | Total | Net ± | % seats | Total votes | % votes | Change |
|---|---|---|---|---|---|---|
| Labour | 237 | ▲21 | 45.9 | ~9,840,000 | 37.7 | ▼5.7% |
| Conservative | 268 | ▼24 | 51.9 | ~10,510,000 | 40.2 | ▼8.1% |
| Liberal | 9 | ▲7 | 1.75 | ~5,570,000 | 21.3 | ▲13.4% |
| | 516 | | 100 | ~26,140,000 | 100 | |

=== October 1974 ===
| Party | Seats | | | Votes | | |
| Party | Total | Net ± | % seats | Total votes | % votes | Change |
|---|---|---|---|---|---|---|
| Labour | 255 | ▲18 | 49.4 | ~9,700,000 | 40.1 | ▲2.4% |
| Conservative | 253 | ▼15 | 49.0 | ~9,410,000 | 38.9 | ▼1.3% |
| Liberal | 9 | ▼1 | 1.55 | ~4,880,000 | 20.2 | ▼1.1% |
| | 516 | | 100 | ~24,190,000 | 100 | |

=== 1979 ===
| Party | Seats | | | Votes | | |
| Party | Total | Net ± | % seats | Total votes | % votes | Change |
|---|---|---|---|---|---|---|
| Conservative | 306 | ▲53 | 59.0 | ~12,260,000 | 47.2 | ▲8.3% |
| Labour | 203 | ▼52 | 39.3 | ~9,530,000 | 36.7 | ▼3.4% |
| Liberal | 7 | ▼1 | 1.35 | ~3,880,000 | 14.9 | ▼5.3% |
| | 516 | | 100 | ~25,970,000 | 100 | |

=== 1983 ===
| Party | Seats | | | | | Votes | | |
| Party | Total | Gains | Losses | Net ± | % seats | Total votes | % votes | Change |
|---|---|---|---|---|---|---|---|---|
| Conservative | 362 | N/A | N/A | ▲37 | 69.2 | 11,711,519 | 46.0 | ▼1.2 |
| Labour | 148 | N/A | N/A | ▼45 | 28.3 | 6,862,422 | 26.8 | ▼9.8 |
| Alliance | 13 | N/A | N/A | ▲8 | 2.5 | 6,714,957 | 26.4 | ▲11.5 |
| Other parties | 0 | N/A | N/A | Steady | — | 183,748 | 0.7 | ▼0.5 |
| | | | | | | 25,472,646 | 72.5 | |

Popular vote
| Conservative | 46.0% |
| Labour | 26.8% |
| SDP–Liberal Alliance | 26.4% |
| Other | 0.7% |

Parliament seats
| Conservative | 69.2% |
| Labour | 28.3% |
| SDP–Liberal Alliance | 2.5% |

=== 1987 ===
| Party | Seats | | | | | Votes | | |
| Party | Total | Gains | Losses | Net ± | % seats | Total votes | % votes | Change |
|---|---|---|---|---|---|---|---|---|
| Conservative | 358 | 9 | 13 | ▼4 | 68.5 | 12,546,186 | 46.2 | ▲0.2 |
| Labour | 155 | 13 | 6 | ▲7 | 29.6 | 8,006,466 | 29.5 | ▲2.5 |
| Alliance | 10 | 2 | 5 | ▼3 | 1.9 | 6,467,350 | 23.8 | ▼2.4 |
| Other parties | 0 | 0 | 0 | Steady | — | 113,520 | 0.4 | ▼0.3 |
| | | | | | | 27,133,522 | 75.4 | ▲2.9 |

Popular vote
| Conservative | 46.2% |
| Labour | 29.5% |
| SDP–Liberal Alliance | 23.8% |
| Other | 0.4% |

Parliament seats
| Conservative | 68.5% |
| Labour | 29.6% |
| SDP–Liberal Alliance | 1.9% |

=== 1992 ===
| Party | Seats | | | | | Votes | | |
| Party | Total | Gains | Losses | Net ± | % seats | Total votes | % votes | Change |
|---|---|---|---|---|---|---|---|---|
| Conservative | 319 | 1 | 40 | ▼39 | 60.9 | 12,796,772 | 45.5 | ▼0.8 |
| Labour | 195 | 40 | 0 | ▲40 | 37.2 | 9,551,910 | 33.9 | ▲4.4 |
| Liberal Democrats | 10 | 4 | 4 | Steady | 1.9 | 5,398,293 | 19.2 | ▼4.7 |
| Other parties | 0 | 0 | 0 | Steady | — | 401,531 | 1.4 | ▲1.0 |
| | | | | | | 28,148,506 | 78.0 | |

Popular vote
| Conservative | 45.5% |
| Labour | 33.9% |
| Liberal Democrats | 19.2% |
| Other | 1.4% |

Parliament seats
| Conservative | 60.9% |
| Labour | 37.2% |
| Liberal Democrats | 1.9% |

=== 1997 ===
| Party | Seats | | | | | Votes | | |
| Party | Total | Gains | Losses | Net ± | % seats | Total votes | % votes | Change |
|---|---|---|---|---|---|---|---|---|
| Labour | 328 | 133 | 1 | ▲132 | 62.0 | 11,347,882 | 43.5 | ▲9.6 |
| Conservative | 165 | 0 | 159 | ▼159 | 31.2 | 8,780,881 | 33.7 | ▼11.8 |
| Liberal Democrats | 34 | 26 | 1 | ▲25 | 6.4 | 4,677,565 | 18.0 | ▼1.3 |
| Referendum | 0 | 0 | 0 | Steady | — | 746,624 | 2.9 | N/A |
| UKIP | 0 | 0 | 0 | Steady | — | 103,521 | 0.4 | N/A |
| Independent | 1 | 1 | 0 | ▲1 | 0.2 | 69,464 | 0.3 | ▲0.2 |
| Green | 0 | 0 | 0 | Steady | — | 60,013 | 0.2 | ▼0.4 |
| Liberal | 0 | 0 | 0 | Steady | — | 44,516 | 0.2 | Steady |
| Socialist Labour | 0 | 0 | 0 | Steady | — | 44,114 | 0.2 | N/A |
| BNP | 0 | 0 | 0 | Steady | — | 35,181 | 0.1 | ▲0.1 |
| Natural Law | 0 | 0 | 0 | Steady | — | 25,958 | 0.1 | ▼0.1 |
| Independent Labour | 0 | 0 | 0 | Steady | — | 24,447 | 0.1 | Steady |
| Speaker | 1 | 1 | 0 | ▲1 | 0.2 | 24,447 | 0.1 | N/A |
| Ind. Conservative | 0 | 0 | 0 | Steady | — | 18,667 | 0.1 | Steady |
| Prolife Alliance | 0 | 0 | 0 | Steady | — | 13,890 | 0.1 | N/A |
| Other parties | 0 | 0 | 0 | Steady | — | 42,020 | 0.2 | N/A |
| | | | | | | 26,058,712 | 71.5 | ▼6.5 |

Popular vote
| Labour | 43.5% |
| Conservative | 33.7% |
| Liberal Democrats | 18.0% |
| Referendum | 2.9% |
| Other | 2.1% |

Parliament seats
| Labour | 62.0% |
| Conservative | 31.2% |
| Liberal Democrats | 6.4% |
| Other | 0.4% |

=== 2001 ===
| Party | Seats | | | | | Votes | | |
| Party | Total | Gains | Losses | Net ± | % seats | Total votes | % votes | Change |
|---|---|---|---|---|---|---|---|---|
| Labour | 323 | 1 | 6 | ▼5 | 61.1 | 9,056,824 | 41.4 | ▼2.1 |
| Conservative | 165 | 8 | 8 | Steady | 31.2 | 7,705,870 | 35.2 | ▲1.5 |
| Liberal Democrats | 40 | 8 | 2 | ▲6 | 8.1 | 4,246,853 | 19.4 | ▲1.5 |
| UKIP | 0 | 0 | 0 | Steady | — | 374,775 | 1.7 | ▲1.3 |
| Green | 0 | 0 | 0 | Steady | — | 158,173 | 0.7 | ▲0.5 |
| Independent | 0 | 0 | 1 | ▼1 | — | 79,559 | 0.4 | ▲0.1 |
| Socialist Alliance | 0 | 0 | 0 | Steady | — | 55,295 | 0.3 | N/A |
| Socialist Labour | 0 | 0 | 0 | Steady | — | 51,299 | 0.2 | ▲0.1 |
| BNP | 0 | 0 | 0 | Steady | — | 46,851 | 0.2 | ▲0.1 |
| Health Concern | 1 | 1 | 0 | ▲1 | 0.2 | 28,487 | 0.1 | N/A |
| Liberal | 0 | 0 | 0 | Steady | — | 13,302 | 0.1 | ▼0.1 |
| Other parties | 0 | 0 | 0 | ▼1 | — | 53,474 | 0.2 | N/A |
| | | | | | | 21,870,762 | 59.1 | ▼12.2 |

Popular vote
| Labour | 41.4% |
| Conservative | 35.2% |
| Liberal Democrats | 19.4% |
| UKIP | 1.7% |
| Other | 1.5% |

Parliament seats
| Labour | 61.1% |
| Conservative | 31.2% |
| Liberal Democrats | 7.6% |
| Other | 0.2% |

=== 2005 ===
| Party | Seats | | | | | Votes | | |
| Party | Total | Gains | Losses | Net ± | % seats | Total votes | % votes | Change |
|---|---|---|---|---|---|---|---|---|
| Labour | 286 | 0 | 37 | ▼37 | 54.1 | 8,043,461 | 35.4 | ▼6.0 |
| Conservative | 194 | 32 | 3 | ▲29 | 36.7 | 8,116,005 | 35.7 | ▲0.5 |
| Liberal Democrats | 47 | 12 | 5 | ▲7 | 8.9 | 5,201,286 | 22.9 | ▲3.6 |
| Respect | 1 | 1 | 0 | ▲1 | 0.2 | 67,422 | 0.3 | ▲0.3 |
| Health Concern | 1 | 0 | 0 | Steady | 0.2 | 18,739 | 0.1 | Steady |
| UKIP | 0 | 0 | 0 | Steady | 0.0 | 592,417 | 2.6 | ▲0.9 |
| Green | 0 | 0 | 0 | Steady | 0.0 | 251,051 | 1.1 | ▲0.4 |
| BNP | 0 | 0 | 0 | Steady | 0.0 | 189,570 | 0.8 | ▲0.6 |
| Veritas | 0 | 0 | 0 | Steady | 0.0 | 39,044 | 0.2 | New |
| Liberal | 0 | 0 | 0 | Steady | 0.0 | 17,547 | 0.1 | Steady |
| Others | 0 | 0 | 0 | Steady | 0.0 | 177,343 | 0.8 | N/A |
| | | | | | | 22,713,855 | 61.0 | ▲1.9 |

Popular vote
| Conservative | 35.7% |
| Labour | 35.4% |
| Liberal Democrats | 22.9% |
| UKIP | 2.6% |
| Greens | 1.1% |
| Other | 2.3% |

Parliament seats
| Labour | 54.1% |
| Conservative | 36.7% |
| Liberal Democrats | 8.9% |
| Respect | 0.2% |
| ICHC | 0.2% |

=== 2010 ===
| Party | Seats | | | | | Votes | | |
| Party | Total | Gains | Losses | Net ± | % seats | Total votes | % votes | Change |
|---|---|---|---|---|---|---|---|---|
| Conservative | 297 | 95 | 4 | ▲91 | 55.7 | 9,908,169 | 39.5 | ▲3.8 |
| Labour | 191 | 2 | 89 | ▼87 | 35.8 | 7,042,398 | 28.1 | ▼7.4 |
| Liberal Democrats | 43 | 8 | 12 | ▼4 | 8.1 | 6,076,189 | 24.2 | ▲1.3 |
| UKIP | 0 | 0 | 0 | Steady | — | 866,633 | 3.5 | ▲0.9 |
| BNP | 0 | 0 | 0 | Steady | — | 532,333 | 2.1 | ▲1.3 |
| Green | 1 | 0 | 0 | ▲1 | 0.2 | 258,954 | 1.0 | ▼0.1 |
| English Democrat | 0 | 0 | 0 | Steady | — | 64,826 | 0.3 | ▲0.2 |
| Respect | 0 | 0 | 0 | ▼1 | — | 33,251 | 0.1 | ▼0.2 |
| Speaker | 1 | 1 | 0 | ▲1 | 0.2 | 22,860 | 0.1 | Steady |
| Health Concern | 0 | 0 | 0 | ▼1 | — | 16,150 | 0.1 | Steady |
| Christian | 0 | 0 | 0 | 0 | — | 15,841 | 0.1 | N/A |
| National Front | 0 | 0 | 0 | 0 | — | 10,400 | 0.0 | Steady |
| TUSC | 0 | 0 | 0 | 0 | — | 8,404 | 0.0 | N/A |
| Socialist Labour | 0 | 0 | 0 | 0 | — | 4,368 | 0.0 | Steady |
| Other parties | 0 | 0 | 0 | 0 | — | 224,341 | 0.9 | Steady |
| | | | | | | 25,085,097 | 65.5 | ▲4.5 |

Popular vote
| Conservative | 39.5% |
| Labour | 28.1% |
| Liberal Democrats | 24.2% |
| UKIP | 3.5% |
| BNP | 2.1% |
| Greens | 1.0% |
| Other | 1.5% |

Parliament seats
| Conservative | 55.7% |
| Labour | 35.8% |
| Liberal Democrats | 8.1% |
| Greens | 0.2% |
| Speaker | 0.2% |

=== 2015 ===
| Party | Seats | | | | | Votes | | |
| Party | Total | Gains | Losses | Net ± | % seats | Total votes | % votes | Change |
|---|---|---|---|---|---|---|---|---|
| Conservative | 318 | 32 | 11 | ▲21 | 59.7 | 10,483,261 | 40.9 | ▲1.4 |
| Labour | 206 | 21 | 6 | ▲15 | 38.6 | 8,087,684 | 31.6 | ▲3.6 |
| UKIP | 1 | 1 | 0 | ▲1 | 0.2 | 3,611,367 | 14.1 | ▲10.7 |
| Liberal Democrats | 6 | 0 | 37 | ▼37 | 1.1 | 2,098,404 | 8.2 | ▼16.0 |
| Green | 1 | 0 | 0 | Steady | 0.2 | 1,073,242 | 4.2 | ▲3.2 |
| Speaker | 1 | 0 | 0 | Steady | 0.2 | 34,617 | 0.1 | Steady |
| TUSC | 0 | 0 | 0 | Steady | — | 32,868 | 0.1 | ▲0.1 |
| NHA | 0 | 0 | 0 | Steady | — | 20,210 | 0.1 | New |
| Respect | 0 | 0 | 0 | Steady | — | 9,989 | 0.0 | ▼0.1 |
| Yorkshire First | 0 | 0 | 0 | Steady | — | 6,811 | 0.0 | New |
| English Democrat | 0 | 0 | 0 | Steady | — | 6,431 | 0.0 | ▼0.2 |
| CISTA | 0 | 0 | 0 | Steady | — | 4,569 | 0.0 | New |
| Monster Raving Loony | 0 | 0 | 0 | Steady | — | 3,432 | 0.0 | Steady |
| CPA | 0 | 0 | 0 | Steady | — | 3,260 | 0.0 | Steady |
| BNP | 0 | 0 | 0 | Steady | — | 1,667 | 0.0 | ▼2.1 |
| Class War | 0 | 0 | 0 | Steady | — | 526 | 0.0 | New |
| Other parties | 0 | 0 | 0 | Steady | — | 127,133 | 0.5 | ▼0.2 |
| | | | | | | 25,571,204 | 65.9 | ▲0.4 |

Popular vote
| Conservative | 40.9% |
| Labour | 31.6% |
| UKIP | 14.1% |
| Liberal Democrats | 8.2% |
| Greens | 4.2% |
| Other | 0.9% |

Parliament seats
| Conservative | 59.7% |
| Labour | 38.6% |
| Liberal Democrats | 1.1% |
| UKIP | 0.2% |
| Greens | 0.2% |
| Speaker | 0.2% |

=== 2017 ===
| Party | Seats | | | | | Votes | | |
| Party | Total | Gains | Losses | Net ± | % seats | Total votes | % votes | Change |
|---|---|---|---|---|---|---|---|---|
| Conservative | 296 | 8 | 30 | ▼22 | 55.5 | 12,344,901 | 45.4 | ▲4.4 |
| Labour | 227 | 27 | 6 | ▲21 | 42.6 | 11,390,099 | 41.9 | ▲10.3 |
| Liberal Democrats | 8 | 5 | 3 | ▲2 | 1.5 | 2,121,810 | 7.8 | ▼0.4 |
| UKIP | 0 | 0 | 1 | ▼1 | — | 557,390 | 2.1 | ▼12.1 |
| Green | 1 | 0 | 0 | Steady | 0.2 | 506,969 | 1.9 | ▼2.3 |
| Speaker | 1 | 0 | 0 | Steady | 0.2 | 34,299 | 0.1 | Steady |
| Yorkshire | 0 | 0 | 0 | Steady | — | 20,958 | 0.1 | ▲0.1 |
| NHA | 0 | 0 | 0 | Steady | — | 16,119 | 0.1 | Steady |
| CPA | 0 | 0 | 0 | Steady | — | 5,869 | 0.0 | Steady |
| BNP | 0 | 0 | 0 | Steady | — | 4,642 | 0.0 | Steady |
| Monster Raving Loony | 0 | 0 | 0 | Steady | — | 3,733 | 0.0 | Steady |
| Women's Equality | 0 | 0 | 0 | Steady | — | 3,066 | 0.0 | Steady |
| English Democrat | 0 | 0 | 0 | Steady | — | 1,913 | 0.0 | Steady |
| Pirate | 0 | 0 | 0 | Steady | — | 1,875 | 0.0 | Steady |
| Workers Revolutionary | 0 | 0 | 0 | Steady | — | 771 | 0.0 | Steady |
| SDP | 0 | 0 | 0 | Steady | — | 321 | 0.0 | Steady |
| Others | 0 | 0 | 0 | Steady | — | 151,054 | 0.6 | ▲0.4 |
| Total | 533 | | | | | 27,165,789 | Turnout | 69.1 |

Popular vote
| Conservative | 45.4% |
| Labour | 41.9% |
| Liberal Democrats | 7.8% |
| UKIP | 2.1% |
| Green | 1.9% |
| Other | 0.9% |

Parliament seats
| Conservative | 55.5% |
| Labour | 42.6% |
| Liberal Democrats | 1.5% |
| Green | 0.2% |
| Speaker | 0.2% |

=== 2019 ===
| Party | Seats | | | | | Votes | | |
| Party | Total | Gains | Losses | Net ± | % seats | Total votes | % votes | Change |
|---|---|---|---|---|---|---|---|---|
| Conservative | 345 | 52 | 3 | ▲49 | 64.7 | 12,710,845 | 47.2 | ▲1.7 |
| Labour | 180 | 1 | 48 | ▼47 | 33.7 | 9,152,034 | 34.0 | ▼7.9 |
| Liberal Democrats | 7 | 2 | 3 | ▼1 | 1.3 | 3,340,835 | 12.4 | ▲4.6 |
| Green | 1 | 0 | 0 | Steady | 0.2 | 819,751 | 3.0 | ▲1.2 |
| Brexit Party | 0 | 0 | 0 | | — | 545,172 | 2.0 | ▲2.0 |
| Yorkshire | 0 | 0 | 0 | Steady | — | 29,201 | 0.1 | Steady |
| UKIP | 0 | 0 | 0 | Steady | — | 18,891 | 0.1 | ▼2.0 |
| Liberal | 0 | 0 | 0 | Steady | — | 10,876 | 0.0 | Steady |
| Change UK | 0 | 0 | 0 | Steady | — | 10,006 | 0.0 | new |
| Monster Raving Loony | 0 | 0 | 0 | Steady | — | 9,394 | 0.0 | Steady |
| CPA | 0 | 0 | 0 | Steady | — | 6,246 | 0.0 | Steady |
| Animal Welfare | 0 | 0 | 0 | Steady | — | 3,086 | 0.0 | Steady |
| SDP | 0 | 0 | 0 | Steady | — | 3,000 | 0.0 | Steady |
| English Democrat | 0 | 0 | 0 | Steady | — | 1,987 | 0.0 | Steady |
| Libertarian | 0 | 0 | 0 | Steady | — | 1,375 | 0.0 | Steady |
| Workers Revolutionary | 0 | 0 | 0 | Steady | — | 524 | 0.0 | Steady |
| Advance | 0 | 0 | 0 | Steady | — | 351 | 0.0 | new |
| Others | 0 | 0 | 0 | Steady | — | 246,094 | 0.9 | ▲0.8 |
| | | | | | | 26,909,668 | 67.4 | ▼1.7 |

Note: the above figures include the Speaker being counted in the Labour totals, despite the Speaker being non-partisan.

Popular vote
| Conservative | 47.2% |
| Labour | 34.0% |
| Liberal Democrats | 12.4% |
| Green | 3.0% |
| Brexit Party | 2.0% |
| Other | 1.4% |

Parliament seats
| Conservative | 64.7% |
| Labour | 33.7% |
| Liberal Democrats | 1.3% |
| Green | 0.2% |

=== 2024 ===
| Party | Seats | | | | | Aggregate votes | | |
| Party | Total | Gains | Losses | Net | Of all (%) | Total | Of all (%) | Difference |
|---|---|---|---|---|---|---|---|---|
| Labour | 347 | 173 | 7 | ▲166 | 63.9 | 8,339,884 | 34.3 | ▲0.5 |
| Conservative | 116 | 1 | 230 | ▼229 | 21.4 | 6,279,411 | 25.9 | ▼21.3 |
| Reform | 5 | 5 | 0 | ▲5 | 0.9 | 3,726,224 | 15.3 | ▲13.3 |
| Liberal Democrats | 65 | 59 | 0 | ▲59 | 12.0 | 3,199,060 | 13.2 | ▲0.8 |
| Green | 4 | 3 | 0 | ▲3 | 0.7 | 1,780,226 | 7.3 | ▲4.3 |
| Independent | 5 | 5 | 0 | ▲5 | 0.9 | 513,266 | 2.1 | ▲1.4 |
| Workers Party | 0 | 0 | 0 | Steady | — | 208,234 | 0.9 | ▲0.9 |
| Speaker | 1 | 0 | 0 | Steady | 0.2 | 25,238 | 0.1 | Steady |
| SDP | 0 | 0 | 0 | Steady | — | 33,385 | 0.1 | ▲0.1 |
| Yorkshire | 0 | 0 | 0 | Steady | — | 17,227 | 0.0 | Steady |
| TUSC | 0 | 0 | 0 | Steady | — | 10,507 | 0.0 | Steady |
| Rejoin EU | 0 | 0 | 0 | Steady | — | 9,245 | 0.0 | Steady |
| Liberal | 0 | 0 | 0 | Steady | — | 5,894 | 0.0 | Steady |
| UKIP | 0 | 0 | 0 | Steady | — | 5,617 | 0.0 | Steady |
| CPA | 0 | 0 | 0 | Steady | — | 5,604 | 0.0 | Steady |
| Heritage | 0 | 0 | 0 | Steady | — | 5,441 | 0.0 | Steady |
| Monster Raving Loony | 0 | 0 | 0 | Steady | — | 5,421 | 0.0 | Steady |
| English Democrat | 0 | 0 | 0 | Steady | — | 5,182 | 0.0 | Steady |
| Party of Women | 0 | 0 | 0 | Steady | — | 5,077 | 0.0 | Steady |
| Hampshire Ind. | 0 | 0 | 0 | Steady | — | 2,872 | 0.0 | Steady |
| Socialist Labour | 0 | 0 | 0 | Steady | — | 2,397 | 0.0 | Steady |
| Climate | 0 | 0 | 0 | Steady | — | 1,863 | 0.0 | Steady |
| Communist | 0 | 0 | 0 | Steady | — | 1,585 | 0.0 | Steady |
| Others | 0 | 0 | 0 | Steady | — | 99,262 | 0.9 | Steady |
| Total | 543 | | | | | 24,288,122 | 60.0 | ▼7.4 |

Aggregate votes
| Labour | 34.4% |
| Conservative | 25.9% |
| Reform UK | 15.3% |
| Liberal Democrats | 13.2% |
| Green | 7.3% |
| Independent | 2.1% |
| Other | 1.7% |

Members of parliament
| Labour | 64.1% |
| Conservative | 21.4% |
| Liberal Democrats | 12.0% |
| Reform UK | 0.9% |
| Independent | 0.9% |
| Green | 0.7% |

== London mayor ==
The mayor of London is elected by the supplementary vote method for a fixed term of four years, with elections taking place in May. As with most elected posts in the United Kingdom, there is a deposit (in this case of £10,000), which is returnable on the candidate's winning of at least 5% of the first-choice votes cast.

== See also ==
- Elections in the United Kingdom
- Elections in Northern Ireland
- Elections in Scotland
- Elections in Wales
