= European Union Withdrawal Agreement (Public Vote) Bill 2017–19 =

Bill of the parliament of the UK

Parliament of the United Kingdom
- Long title: A Bill to provide that any Withdrawal Agreement between the United Kingdom and the European Union shall not have effect without a vote by the electorate of the United Kingdom and Gibraltar to that effect; to make arrangements for the holding of such a public vote; and for connected purposes.
- Citation: HC Bill 208 (PDF) parliament.uk page
- Considered by: Parliament of the United Kingdom

Legislative history
- Bill title: 208
- Introduced by: Gareth Thomas
- First reading: 9 May 2018

Repeals
- European Union (Notification of Withdrawal) Act 2017 (automatically upon the result of the public vote in the event of more votes cast in favour of "Remain a member of the European Union")

Related legislation
- Fixed-term Parliaments Act 2011; Political Parties, Elections and Referendums Act 2000
- Status: Not passed

The European Union Withdrawal Agreement (Public Vote) Bill 2017–19 was a private member's bill of the Parliament of the United Kingdom to make provision for the holding of a “public vote” (referendum) in the United Kingdom and Gibraltar following the conclusion of negotiations by Her Majesty's Government and the European Union on whether to support the proposed exit deal for the United Kingdom's withdrawal from the European Union or to remain a member state of the EU. The bill was sponsored by English Labour Co-operative MP Gareth Thomas. The bill failed upon the conclusion of the parliamentary session in November 2019, and withdrawal took place on 31 January 2020 without a second referendum.

== Provisions ==
=== Public vote ===
The Bill proposed that a “public vote” (referendum) be held in the United Kingdom and Gibraltar before 1 February 2019 on whether to support the proposed Withdrawal Agreement which would take the UK out of the European Union or reject the proposed agreement and remain a member state of the EU.

The Bill would have required the Secretary of State to lay before each House of Parliament a copy of the proposed Withdrawal Agreement no later than 31 October 2018.

==== Proposed public vote question ====
The Bill stipulated the following proposed question to appear on ballot papers:

Do you support the Government’s proposed United Kingdom and Gibraltar Agreement for withdrawal from the European Union or Should the United Kingdom remain a member of the European Union?

with the responses to the question to be marked with a single (X):

Support the proposed Withdrawal Agreement
Remain a member of the European Union

The Bill also ordered the question to be printed in Welsh.

==== Definition of public vote ====
The Bill proposed to legally define the referendum as a “public vote” as follows:

(1) Subject to the following paragraphs—

(a) the provisions of Part 7 of the Political Parties, Elections and Referendums Act 2000 (general provision about referendums) apply to the public vote under this Act, and

(b) those provisions shall apply as if, for the words “referendum” and “referendums” in each case where they appear, the words "public vote" and "public votes" respectively.

(2) It shall the duty of all public authorities, in publications and communications about the public vote provided for under this Act, to use the term "public vote" and not to use the term "referendum".

=== Outcome ===
The Bill stipulated that the proposed Withdrawal Agreement could not be ratified unless the following two conditions were met, as follows if more votes were cast in favour of “Support the proposed Withdrawal Agreement”:

Result of the Public Vote

(1) The Government shall not conclude any agreement on terms of withdrawal from the European Union, or on the United Kingdom’s future relationship with the European Union until the conditions in subsection (2) are met.

(2) The conditions are that—

(a) more votes are cast in the public vote held under section 2 in favour of the answer "Support the proposed Withdrawal Agreement" than the answer "Remain a member of the European Union", and

(b) the terms of withdrawal from the European Union have been approved by resolution in both Houses of Parliament.

(3) The resolutions, under subsection (2)(b), in both Houses of Parliament must be passed within one week after the result of the public vote, held under section 2, is declared.

==== Majority for withdrawal ====
If more votes were cast in favour of "Support the proposed Withdrawal Agreement" then both Houses of Parliament would have been required to vote on whether to ratify the proposed Withdrawal Agreement within one week of the public vote result being declared, and the Secretary of State would have had to repeal the provisions to remain in the EU as follows:

(7) If—

(a) more votes are cast in the public vote in favour of the answer “Support the proposed Withdrawal Agreement” than “Remain a member of the European Union”, and

(b) the resolutions, under subsection (2)(b), in both Houses of Parliament approve the terms of withdrawal from the European Union, the Secretary of State must by regulations repeal section 5 (“provisions to remain in the European Union”).

==== Majority for remain ====
If more votes were cast in favour of “Remain a member of the European Union” then the Bill proposed to automatically repeal the European Union (Notification of Withdrawal) Act 2017 upon the result of the public vote and required the Prime Minister to notify the EU of the UK's retraction of its Article 50 notice as follows:

Result of the public vote: provisions to remain in the European Union

(1) The European Union (Notification of Withdrawal) Act 2017 is repealed.

(2) The Prime Minister must notify the European Commission of the retraction of the notification under Article 50(2) of the Treaty on European Union of the United Kingdom’s intention to leave the European Union.

=== Power to precipitate an early General Election ===
The Bill stipulated that if both conditions required to rectify the proposed Withdrawal Agreement could not be legally met (i.e., the Withdrawal Agreement was approved by "public vote," but rejected by Parliament) then the provisions of section 2 of the Fixed-term Parliaments Act 2011 would automatically come into effect within one week of the result, as follows:

[...] the provisions of section 2 of the Fixed-term Parliaments Act 2011 ("early parliamentary general election") shall apply in these circumstances as if the House of Commons had passed a motion under section 2(2) of that Act.

== Legislative history ==
The bill passed its first reading on 9 May 2018. A second reading was originally scheduled for 6 July 2018, then delayed to 8 February 2019, and ultimately not held. The bill failed with the conclusion of the 2017–19 parliamentary session upon Parliament's dissolution on 6 November 2019 in advance of the 2019 general election.

== See also ==
- Brexit
- Proposed referendum on the Brexit withdrawal agreement
- People's Vote
- Terms of Withdrawal from EU (Referendum) Bills
- Opposition to Brexit in the United Kingdom
