= 2020 UK general election =

#REDIRECT Fixed-term Parliaments Act 2011#2017 general election

- From an unprintworthy page title: This is a redirect from a title that would not be helpful in a printed or CD/DVD version of Wikipedia. See Wikipedia:Printability and Version 1.0 Editorial Team for more information.
