= Terms of Withdrawal from EU (Referendum) Bills =

Bills of the UK parliament

Terms of Withdrawal from EU (Referendum) Bill 2016-17

Parliament of the United Kingdom
- Long title: A Bill to Require the holding of a referendum to endorse the United Kingdom and Gibraltar exit package proposed by HM Government for withdrawal from the EU, or to decide to remain a member, prior to the UK giving notice under Article 50 of the Treaty on European Union; and for connected purposes.
- Citation: HC Bill 46
- Considered by: Parliament of the United Kingdom

Legislative history
- Introduced by: Geraint Davies
- First reading: 6 July 2016
- Second reading: 24 February 2017
- Status: Not passed

Terms of Withdrawal from EU (Referendum) Bill 2017-19

Parliament of the United Kingdom
- Long title: A Bill to Require the holding of a referendum to endorse the United Kingdom and Gibraltar exit package proposed by HM Government for withdrawal from the EU, or to decide to remain a member, following the completion of formal exit negotiations; and for connected purposes.
- Citation: HC Bill 103
- Considered by: Parliament of the United Kingdom

Legislative history
- Introduced by: Geraint Davies
- First reading: 6 September 2017
- Second reading: 26 October 2018
- Status: Not passed

The Terms of Withdrawal from EU (Referendum) Bills were a series of private member's bills of the Parliament of the United Kingdom to make provision for the holding of a second referendum in the United Kingdom and Gibraltar on whether or not to leave the European Union either before Article 50 of the Lisbon Treaty can be triggered or following the conclusion of negotiations by the Welsh Labour MP Geraint Davies. The first version of this bill was presented in the 2016–2017 session of Parliament to the House of Commons and received its first reading on 6 July 2016 but lapsed when Parliament was dissolved. The Government triggered Article 50 at the end of March 2017.

A second version this bill was presented in the 2017–2019 session of Parliament, after Article 50 was triggered. The bill with its proposal to hold a referendum on the negotiated terms of withdrawal from the EU remains in the UK parliament and was first introduced to the House of Commons and received its first reading 6 September 2017 and its due to have its second reading on 6 July 2018.

== Origin ==
On 23 June 2016 the United Kingdom and Gibraltar voted by 51.9% to 48.1% to Leave the European Union in the 2016 EU membership referendum. The result saw contrasting views throughout the country with Greater London, Northern Ireland and Scotland strongly voting to remain whilst all the other English regions and Wales voted to leave.

The original 2016-17 bill sought to hold the proposed referendum before Article 50 could be formally triggered by HM Government however the bill failed to pass before the United Kingdom triggered Article 50 on 29 March 2017 and the snap general election which was held on 8 June 2017. This led to a second version of the bill which proposes to hold the referendum following the conclusion of negotiations between the Government and the European Union.

== Bills proposed referendum question ==
The bills give the proposed question to appear on ballot papers:

Do you support the Government’s proposed United Kingdom and Gibraltar exit package for negotiating withdrawal from the European Union or Should the United Kingdom remain a member of the European Union?

with the responses to the question to be (to be marked with a single (X)):

Support the Governments proposed exit package
Remain a member of the European Union

The Bills also order the question to be printed in Welsh.

== See also ==
- 2016 United Kingdom European Union membership referendum
- European Union Referendum Act 2015
- European Union (Notification of Withdrawal) Act 2017
- United Kingdom invocation of Article 50
- Opposition to Brexit in the United Kingdom
- European Union Withdrawal Agreement (Public Vote) Bill 2017-19
