= Fixed-term election =

Election that occurs on a set date

A fixed-term election is an election that occurs on a set date, which cannot be changed by incumbent politicians other than through exceptional mechanisms if at all. The office holder generally takes office for a set amount of time, and their term of office or mandate ends automatically.

Most modern democracies hold fixed-terms elections. The term of office varies, but in many countries it is five years. Fixed-term elections are common for directly elected executive officers, such as directly elected mayors, governors and presidents, but less common for prime ministers and parliaments in a parliamentary system of government.

== Examples ==
- The Australian Senate has a semi-fixed term that can be cut short only by a double dissolution under Section 57 of the Australian constitution, used if there is a prolonged deadlock over a bill supported by the Australian House of Representatives. While the term itself is fixed, the election date can be shifted with the government having a ten month window it can schedule the election on. After a double dissolution election, to restore rotation, newly elected Senators' terms are backdated to the previous 1 July so that they serve less than three or six years. Since the Australian House of Representatives has a maximum term of only three years but no minimum term, elections for the two houses can become desynchronised, resulting in separate elections for each house. However, this has not happened since 1970. The Australian states and territories of New South Wales, South Australia, Victoria, Queensland, the Northern Territory and the Australian Capital Territory (ACT) have semi-fixed terms in that dissolution at any time in mid-term is allowed only to resolve a serious deadlock.
- Elections to the European Parliament are considered the second largest democratic elections in the world and occur every five years on a weekend in June. Each country is relatively free to set its own election rules and each chooses one out of the four days of the selected weekend to hold its election.
- In Hong Kong, according to the Hong Kong Basic Law, the Chief Executive is elected every five years and the Legislative Council is elected every four years. Under some circumstances the Chief Executive may dissolve the Legislative Council, and under some other circumstances the Chief Executive is obliged to resign. In 2005 it was resolved that if the office of the Chief Executive is left vacant, the successor serves only the remainder of the term of their predecessor.
- Elections in Norway take place every two years, alternating between parliamentary and local elections. Norway is unusual in that the legislature cannot be dissolved early (a trait it shares with the United States but few other countries): the Storting always serves its full four-year term; the constitution does not allow snap elections, nor does it give the monarch the right to dissolve parliament even if the government wants to do so.
- Elections in Russia to the State Duma are for a five-year term. The President of Russia has the authority to dissolve the Duma and call a snap election in two cases: if the Duma refuses to approve the President's appointee for Prime Minister of Russia three times in a row, or if the Duma passes a motion of no-confidence in the Government of Russia twice in three months.
- Elections in Sweden take place every four years. Extra elections can be called by the Prime Minister. They happen automatically when and if the Speaker fails four times to present a candidate for Prime Minister that Parliament can accept. Extra elections do not replace regular ones - they do not move the four-year schedule.
- In the United Kingdom, the only fixed-term election for the House of Commons was in 2015, the date having been determined by the Fixed-term Parliaments Act 2011. Under the act, elections were set for the 25th working day following the day when a parliamentary term ended on its fifth year. The UK Parliament voted to bring the 2020 election forward to 2017, followed by its fast-tracking of the Early Parliamentary General Election Act 2019. Both acts were repealed by the Dissolution and Calling of Parliament Act 2022. Fixed-term elections to the UK's devolved parliaments are held on the first Thursday in May every five years. Unlike Canada, Germany, and Australia, provision is not made for early dissolving Parliament through exceptional means, with the monarch able to dissolve parliament at their pleasure.
- Elections in the United States: Members of Congress and the President serve fixed terms, and no mechanisms exist for early elections. General elections for Congress occur every two years on Election Day in November. The President is technically elected every four years by the Electoral College. However, it is customary today for electors to be chosen based on the outcome of popular votes for President, held along with Congressional elections when applicable. Congress and the President remain in office until January the following year. Most U.S. states and territories also have fixed terms for their legislatures and executives, and most hold their general elections on the federal Election Day, though several states hold off-year elections instead.

=== Maximum terms ===
A number of countries do not provide for fixed terms for elected officials, instead stipulating the maximum length of a term, permitting elections to be held more frequently as determined by the government. Such examples include the House of Commons of the UK, the Australian House of Representatives, the Canadian House of Commons, the New Zealand Parliament, and the Folketing of Denmark; in each case the prime minister may advise the monarch to call an election earlier than the constitutional maximum term of the parliament.

== See also ==
- List of democracy and elections-related topics
- Fixed election dates in Canada
