= Early Parliamentary General Election Act 2019 =

Act of the Parliament of the United Kingdom

Early Parliamentary General Election Act 2019 (Note: Section 2(2).)
- Act of Parliament
- Parliament of the United Kingdom
- Long title: An Act to make provision for a parliamentary general election to be held on 12 December 2019.
- Citation: 2019 c. 29
- Introduced by: Boris Johnson, Prime Minister (Commons); Baroness Evans of Bowes Park, Leader of the House of Lords (Lords)
- Territorial extent: United Kingdom

Dates
- Royal assent: 31 October 2019
- Commencement: 31 October 2019 (Note: Section 2(1).)
- Repealed: 24 March 2022
Other legislation
Repealed by	Dissolution and Calling of Parliament Act 2022
Relates to	Fixed-term Parliaments Act 2011

Status: Repealed

History of passage through Parliament

Text of statute as originally enacted

Revised text of statute as amended

The Early Parliamentary General Election Act 2019 (c. 29), also known as the Election Bill, was an act of the Parliament of the United Kingdom that made legal provision for the holding of the 2019 general election on 12 December 2019.

The act was fast-tracked in its passage through Parliament, meaning that it completed all of its stages in the House of Commons in a single day, on 29 October 2019, and received its formal First Reading in the House of Lords on the same day. It completed its remaining stages there on 30 October, and received royal assent, thereby becoming law, on 31 October.

The act was a very unusual piece of constitutional legislation, as it made the 2019 general election unique by being the first (and quite possibly only) national election in UK history to have been triggered by a piece of specific legislation that circumvented the operation of ordinary electoral law. The act also directly demonstrated the ancient principle of parliamentary sovereignty that Parliament cannot bind its successors.

The ordinary law on parliamentary general elections at the time of the passing of the act was the Fixed-term Parliaments Act 2011 ("FTPA"), under which elections took place every five years, except that an early general election could be triggered by the House of Commons in either of two ways: a resolution supported by at least two-thirds of the total membership of the House, or a vote of no confidence in the government, when an election must be called after fourteen days unless a motion of confidence has been passed. The 2019 act, being a new act, required only a simple majority of the members voting, in each house, in order to pass.

The act automatically became spent upon the conclusion of the election and was repealed by the Dissolution and Calling of Parliament Act 2022 which also repealed the FTPA on 24 March 2022.

== Background ==
On the weekend of 26 October 2019 the Liberal Democrats and the Scottish National Party proposed introducing a bill in the House of Commons to hold a general election on 9 December 2019. This proposal was initially rejected by the Boris Johnson government as a "gimmick", owing to a vote on an early election under the Fixed-term Parliaments Act 2011 (FTPA) which was to be held on 28 October 2019.

Two previous attempts in September to get a favourable vote for an early election had failed, and the government said it would keep its options open should the third early election motion fail to pass. It did fail, as the required two-thirds majority was not achieved, leaving the government still unable to trigger an election.

On 29 October, Prime Minister Boris Johnson introduced an election bill to the House of Commons to circumvent the FTPA and trigger a general election. Only a simple majority of MPs and Lords was needed for the Bill to pass. The election date set in the Bill was Thursday, 12 December 2019. After amendments to change the proposed date were voted down, the Commons approved the Bill by a vote of 438 to 20, (Note: There was a difference between the official result of this division based on the Tellers' count and the number of Members' names recorded. Numbers below are based on the names recorded.) with the Lords agreeing to the Bill without a vote the following day.

Early Parliamentary General Election Bill Third Reading
Ballot →	29 October 2019
Aye	439 / 638 (Note: Including the two tellers, Stuart Andrew and Iain Stewart.)
No	22 / 638 (Note: Including the two tellers, Ben Lake and Chris Leslie.)
Abstentions	177 / 638 (Note: Excluding one vacant seat, seven abstentionist Sinn Féin MPs, the Speaker, and three Deputy Speakers.)
Sources: Votes in Parliament

== Provisions ==
The key provisions of the act, which contained only two sections, are section 1, subsections (1) and (2):

- (1) An early parliamentary general election is to take place on 12 December 2019 in consequence of the passing of this Act.
- (2) That day is to be treated as a polling day appointed under section 2(7) of the Fixed-term Parliaments Act 2011.

Although the act referred to the FTPA, it did not amend it. Consequently, under FTPA section 1(3), following the 2019 election the next election was scheduled for the first Thursday in May (2 May) 2024.

=== Short title, commencement and extent ===
Section 2(1) of the act provided that the act would come into force upon royal assent.

Section 2(2) of the act provided that the act may be cited as the "Early Parliamentary General Election Act 2019".

=== Repeal of FTPA ===
After FTPA's repeal under the Dissolution and Calling of Parliament Act 2022, the DCPA provides for a parliamentary term to automatically end five years after the day Parliament has first been called, if it has not been dissolved sooner, and instead called for the 2020s' first general election to be held 25 working days following the dissolution. In terms of dates, the 58th Parliament, which first met on 17 December 2019, was scheduled to be dissolved on the same day in 2024, and the next parliamentary polling day was scheduled for no later than 28 January 2025. Instead, its dissolution was on 30 May 2024 and that year's election was held on 4 July.

== Outcome ==
Parliament was dissolved on 6 November.

The election produced an overall majority of 80 seats for the Conservative Party, led by Prime Minister Boris Johnson. The Conservatives won 365 seats, an increase of 48, while the Labour Party, led by Jeremy Corbyn, won 202, a loss of 60. Following the result, Corbyn announced that he would stand down as Labour Party leader early in 2020.

The results of the 2019 general election from across the 650 parliamentary constituencies in the UK

Parties	Seats	Change
Conservative Party	365	▲48
Labour Party	202	▼60
Scottish National Party	48	▲13
Liberal Democrats	11	▼1
Plaid Cymru	4	Steady
Green Party	1	Steady
Brexit Party	0	New party
Others	19	Steady
Conservative overall majority of 80

== See also ==
- Brexit
- Elections in the United Kingdom
