= Dissolution and Calling of Parliament Act 2022 =

UK constitutional legislation

Dissolution and Calling of Parliament Act 2022 (Note: Section 6(4).)
- Act of Parliament
- Parliament of the United Kingdom
- Long title: An Act to make provision about the dissolution and calling of Parliament, including provision for the repeal of the Fixed-term Parliaments Act 2011; and for connected purposes.
- Citation: 2022 c. 11
- Introduced by: Michael Gove, Chancellor of the Duchy of Lancaster (Commons); Lord True, Minister of State for the Cabinet Office (Lords)
- Territorial extent: England and Wales; Scotland; Northern Ireland; (Note: Section 6(1).)

Dates
- Royal assent: 24 March 2022
- Commencement: 24 March 2022 (Note: Section 6(3).)
Other legislation
Amends	Succession to the Crown Act 1707; Representation of the People Act 1867; Regency Act 1937; Representation of the People Act 1983; Representation of the People Act 1985; Scotland Act 1998; Political Parties, Elections and Referendums Act 2000; Representation of the People (England and Wales) Regulations 2001; Representation of the People (Scotland) Regulations 2001; Government of Wales Act 2006; Welfare Reform Act 2012; Electoral Registration and Administration Act 2013; Wales Act 2014; Recall of MPs Act 2015; Small Business, Enterprise and Employment Act 2015; Referendums (Scotland) Act 2020
Repeals/revokes	Fixed-term Parliaments Act 2011; Early Parliamentary General Election Act 2019 (Note: Already spent, upon the holding of that election.)
Amended by	Retained EU Law (Revocation and Reform) Act 2023

Status: Amended

History of passage through Parliament

Text of statute as originally enacted

Revised text of statute as amended

The Dissolution and Calling of Parliament Act 2022 (c. 11) is an act of the Parliament of the United Kingdom that repealed the Fixed-term Parliaments Act 2011 and reinstated the prior constitutional situation, by reviving the power of the monarch to dissolve and summon parliament.

It was originally drafted as the Fixed-term Parliaments Act 2011 (Repeal) Bill. Announced formally in the 2021 State Opening of Parliament, it received its first reading on 12 May 2021 and received Royal Assent on 24 March 2022. It was introduced by Chancellor of the Duchy of Lancaster, Michael Gove.

The act fulfilled the government's manifesto promise to repeal the Fixed-term Parliaments Act. In response to the Supreme Court of the United Kingdom ruling that the 2019 prorogation was unlawful, the act contains an ouster clause which seeks to ensure the non-justiciability of the revived prerogative powers. This could prevent the courts from making rulings in relation to the sovereign's power to dissolve Parliament.

== Background ==
Shortly after becoming prime minister in July 2019, Boris Johnson held three votes in the House of Commons to try to gain its approval to call a general election, but failed to achieve the two-thirds parliamentary majority required by the Fixed-term Parliaments Act. A general election was called by passing a separate Act, the Early Parliamentary General Election Act 2019. Ahead of this 2019 general election, the Conservative Party manifesto included a commitment to repeal the FTPA, saying "We will get rid of the Fixed Term Parliaments Act – it has led to paralysis at a time the country needed decisive action", and the Labour Party manifesto also pledged to repeal the Act, saying "A Labour government will repeal the Fixed-term Parliaments Act 2011, which has stifled democracy and propped up weak governments".

An earlier private member's bill titled the Fixed-term Parliaments Act 2011 (Repeal) Bill was introduced by Lord Mancroft in the House of Lords in February 2020, but did not proceed beyond first reading.

== Provisions ==
The act repeals the Fixed-term Parliaments Act 2011 (section 1) and revives the powers relating to the dissolution and calling of Parliaments derived from the royal prerogative "as if the Fixed-term Parliaments Act 2011 had never been enacted" (section 2), in effect restoring the constitutional situation prior to 2011. Section 3, an ouster clause, removes questions over the exercise of these powers, over any decision relating to them, and over their limits and extent from the jurisdiction of courts and tribunals. Finally, the act provides for Parliament's automatic dissolution once five years have elapsed from its first meeting after an election (section 4).

== Legislative history ==
=== Joint Committee on the Fixed-term Parliaments Act ===
The original draft of the Fixed-term Parliaments Act 2011 (Repeal) Bill was published on 1 December 2020 for consideration by the parliamentary Joint Committee on the Fixed-term Parliaments Act. In evidence submitted to the joint committee from December 2020 to January 2021, legal experts highlighted a number of contentious points in the legal implications of the Bill. One of these was whether the power of dissolution created by the bill would in fact be derived from the royal prerogative, or whether it would be a statutory power. The Sydney constitutional law professor Anne Twomey argued that the bill could not revive the royal prerogative by definition, since a prerogative is a non-statutory executive power and common law is created by courts and not legislatures. Cambridge public law professor Alison Young stated that the matter was unclear. In contrast, the former Supreme Court judges Baroness Hale and Lord Sumption, as well as a former First Parliamentary Counsel, Sir Stephen Laws, said that the prerogative could be restored by Parliament.

Secondly, some specialists questioned the validity of the bill's ouster clause. Lord Lisvane and Malcolm Jack, both former Clerks of the House of Commons, as well as Alison Young, argued that the clause may fail in practice, with Lord Lisvane describing its wording as "a probably doomed attempt to sidestep the Anisminic principle". Lord Sumption argued that though a "sufficiently desperate" court could likely find a way to circumvent the ouster clause, its presence in the bill should serve to discourage such attempts.

The joint committee published its report on the bill on 24 March 2021. The majority of the committee held that the ouster clause was acceptable given that "Parliament should be able to designate certain matters as ones which are to be resolved in the political rather than the judicial sphere", and could not be considered an overreach of executive authority since "the power in question is to enable the electorate to determine who should hold power". On the issue of the prerogative, the committee held that the wording of the bill was sufficient to restore the substance, if not necessarily the form, of the constitutional situation prior to the Fixed-term Parliaments Act. The committee also recommended that the draft be retitled the Dissolution and Summoning of Parliament Bill, considering that the bill would be a fundamental constitutional statute and would do more than simply repeal the Fixed-term Parliaments Act.

The committee also considered whether the monarch ought to have the power to refuse a request from the prime minister to dissolve Parliament. In its statement of principles accompanying the draft bill, the government had stated that "in future Parliament will be dissolved by the Sovereign, on the advice of the Prime Minister". In the system preceding the Fixed-term Parliaments Act, however, dissolution was requested, not advised, by the prime minister, meaning that the monarch reserved the right to decline the request. The committee called on the government to "make it clear that the power to grant or refuse a dissolution returns to the Monarch, who in exceptional cases, may refuse the request".

=== Passage through Parliament ===
The Dissolution and Calling of Parliament Bill was introduced by Michael Gove, the minister for the Cabinet Office, to the House of Commons and received its first reading on 12 May 2021.

On 9 February 2022, the House of Lords voted to amend the bill to require a Commons vote before dissolution could happen by 200 votes to 160. The House of Commons voted to reject the amendment on 14 March by 292 votes to 217. On 22 March, the peers accepted the Commons' reason without a vote to dismiss the amendment. The bill received royal assent on 24 March.
