= Fixed-term Parliaments Act 2011 =

Act of the Parliament of the United Kingdom

Fixed-term Parliament Act 2011 (Note: Section 7(1).)
- Act of Parliament
- Parliament of the United Kingdom
- Long title: An Act to make provision about the dissolution of Parliament and the determination of polling days for parliamentary general elections; and for connected purposes.
- Citation: 2011 c. 14
- Introduced by: Nick Clegg, Deputy Prime Minister (Commons); Lord Wallace of Tankerness, Advocate General for Scotland (Lords)
- Territorial extent: United Kingdom

Dates
- Royal assent: 15 September 2011
- Commencement: 15 September 2011 (Note: Section 7(2).)
- Repealed: 24 March 2022
Other legislation
| Amends | Succession to the Crown Act 1707; Representation of the People Act 1867; Parliament Act 1911; Regency Act 1937; Representation of the People Act 1983; Representation of the People Act 1985; Parliamentary Constituencies Act 1986; Political Parties, Elections and Referendums Act 2000; Elections Act 2001 |
| Repeals/revokes | Septennial Act 1715 |
| Repealed by | Dissolution and Calling of Parliament Act 2022 |
| Relates to | Triennial Act 1640; Meeting of Parliament Act 1694; Parliament Act 1911; Early Parliamentary General Election Act 2019 |

Status: Repealed

History of passage through Parliament

Text of statute as originally enacted

Revised text of statute as amended

The Fixed-term Parliaments Act 2011 (c. 14) (FTPA) was an act of the Parliament of the United Kingdom which, for the first time, set in legislation a default fixed election date for general elections in the United Kingdom. It remained in force until 2022, when it was repealed by the Dissolution and Calling of Parliament Act 2022. Since then, as before its enactment, elections are required by law to be held at least once every five years, but can be called earlier if the prime minister advises the monarch to exercise the royal prerogative to do so. Prime ministers have often employed this mechanism to call an election before the end of their five-year term, sometimes fairly early in it. Critics have said this gives an unfair advantage to the incumbent prime minister, allowing them to call a general election at a time that suits them electorally. While it was in force, the FTPA removed this longstanding power of the prime minister.

Under the FTPA, general elections were automatically scheduled for the first Thursday in May of the fifth year after the previous general election, or the fourth year if the date of the previous election was before the first Thursday in May. However, the FTPA also provided two ways to call an election earlier. One was a Commons vote of no confidence in the government, which still required only a simple majority of voters. The other was a vote explicitly in favour of an earlier election, which required a qualified majority of two-thirds of the total membership of the Commons. The first election under the FTPA was held on 7 May 2015. An early election was held in 2017, after Prime Minister Theresa May received approval to call it by a two-thirds majority.

Under the FTPA, the following general election was scheduled for 2022, but the Early Parliamentary General Election Act 2019, passed with Opposition support, circumvented the FTPA, providing for an election on 12 December 2019 while otherwise leaving the FTPA in place. The Conservative Party entered the election with a manifesto pledge to repeal the FTPA. The resulting Conservative majority government, in fulfilment of its commitment, published on 1 December 2020 a draft Fixed-term Parliaments Act 2011 (Repeal) Bill to repeal the FTPA and revive the royal prerogative power of dissolving Parliament as it existed before the act. The repealing legislation was formally announced in the Queen's Speech of 11 May 2021, and granted royal assent as the Dissolution and Calling of Parliament Act 2022 on 24 March 2022.

== Background ==
The Parliament of England originated as a board of advisors for the monarch, or curia regis. As the king was able to summon Parliament at will, so could he dissolve it by royal proclamation. Events of the 17th century began to regulate the summoning and dissolution of Parliament; the English Civil War was in large part caused by the efforts of Charles I to rule without it. The Triennial Act 1640 (16 Cha. 1. c. 1) was passed to require Parliament meet for at least one session every three years, providing for a failsafe mechanism should the king fail to issue the appropriate writs; this was replaced by the Meeting of Parliament Act 1694 (6 & 7 Will. & Mar. c. 2), requiring annual sessions and a general election at least every three years.

The Septennial Act 1715 (1 Geo. 1. St. 2. c. 38) increased the maximum lifespan of a parliament to seven years. The Chartists demanded annual parliamentary elections, which was the only demand of theirs that was not achieved by the early 20th century. The Parliament Act 1911 (1 & 2 Geo. 5. c. 13) amended the Septennial Act by reducing the lifespan to five years. These laws can be, and have been, abrogated in times of great crisis, in practice during both World Wars, whose respective parliaments lasted from 1910 to 1918 and from 1935 to 1945.

Despite these regulations, the royal prerogative to dissolve Parliament within the bounds of law remained. Events of the 18th and 19th century reduced the monarch's personal power in politics in favour of that of his nominal advisor the prime minister, such that by the 19th century prime ministers had a great deal of de facto control over the timing of general elections. The handing of such power to the prime minister was a convention rather than any formal law, and the monarch could (and, since the repeal of the FTPA, can) in theory refuse to grant such a request; the Lascelles Principles formulated in 1950 outline the possible scenarios in which such a refusal would likely be made.

The statutory lifespan referred to the lifetime of the parliament and not to the interval between general elections. For example, while John Major's government lasted four years, eleven months and two days; the period between the general elections of 1992 and 1997 was five years and twenty-two days. No parliament in practice ever reached this milestone outside of the World Wars, as it was always dissolved before its expiry. The longest Parliament preceding the FTPA, other than during wartime, was the 51st Parliament (1992–1997), which lasted four years, eleven months and two days.

The lack of a fixed parliamentary term allowed for the prime minister to decide when to hold an election solely on partisan grounds; it was also criticised for creating uncertainty before the calling of an election when such a calling was anticipated.

== Main parties' views ==
Until 2010 the Conservative Party's manifesto made no mention of fixed-term Parliaments. The Labour Party manifesto for 2010 said that it would introduce fixed-term Parliaments, but did not say how long they would be. The Liberal Democrat manifesto for 2010 included a pledge to introduce four-year fixed-term Parliaments. The 2010 election resulted in a hung Parliament, with the Conservatives having 306 MPs and the Liberal Democrats 57 MPs. The two parties negotiated a coalition agreement to form a government, and a commitment to legislate for fixed-term Parliaments was included in the coalition deal. The journalist John Rentoul has suggested that one of the subsequent coalition government's motives for passing the legislation was a concern about its own potential instability. In this view the legislation was intended to make it difficult for either coalition partner to force an early election and bring the government down.

== Provisions ==
Section 3(1) of the act originally stated that Parliament should be automatically dissolved seventeen working days before the polling day of a general election. This was subsequently amended by the Electoral Registration and Administration Act 2013 to twenty-five working days. Section 1 of the FTPA provided for the polling day to occur on the first Thursday in May of the fifth year after the previous general election, starting with 7 May 2015.

The Prime Minister was given the power to postpone this date by up to two months by laying a draft statutory instrument before the House proposing that polling day occur up to two months later than that date. If the use of such a statutory instrument were approved by each House of Parliament, the Prime Minister had the power, by order made by statutory instrument under section 1(5), to provide that polling day occurs accordingly.

Section 2 of the FTPA also provided for two ways in which a general election could be held before the end of this five-year period:

- If the House of Commons resolved "That this House has no confidence in Her Majesty's Government" (a motion of no confidence), an early general election would be held, unless the House of Commons subsequently resolved "That this House has confidence in Her Majesty's Government". This second resolution must be made within fourteen days of the first. This provision recognised that in a hung parliament it might be possible for a new government to be formed, commanding a majority.
- If the House of Commons, with the support of two-thirds of its total membership (including vacant seats), resolved "That there shall be an early parliamentary general election".

In either of these two cases, the Monarch (on the recommendation of the Prime Minister) appointed the date of the new election by proclamation. Parliament was then dissolved 25 working days before that date.

Apart from the automatic dissolution in anticipation of a general election, whether held early or not, section 3(2) provided that "Parliament cannot otherwise be dissolved". The FTPA thus removed the traditional royal prerogative to dissolve Parliament, and repealed the Septennial Act 1715 as well as references in other Acts to the royal prerogative. The royal prerogative to prorogue Parliament – that is, to end a parliamentary session – was not affected by the FTPA.

=== Review ===
Under section 7(4)–(6) of the FTPA the Prime Minister was obliged to establish a committee to review the operation of the FTPA and to make recommendations for its amendment or repeal, if appropriate. The committee was required to be established between 1 June and 30 November 2020, and the majority of its members must be members of the House of Commons. On 10 November 2020, the House of Commons ordered the establishment of a Joint Committee pursuant to the FTPA and appointed the Commons members of the Committee.

== Debate ==
When introducing the Bill that became the FTPA into the House of Commons, Nick Clegg, then Deputy Prime Minister and Leader of the Liberal Democrats, said that "by setting the date that Parliament will [be] dissolve[d], our Prime Minister is giving up the right to pick and choose the date of the next general election—that's a true first in British politics."

The government initially indicated that an "enhanced majority" of 55 per cent of MPs would be needed to trigger a dissolution, but this did not become part of the FTPA. Instead, the FTPA contained the two-thirds requirement.

Proposed amendments that would have limited the fixed term to four years, backed by Labour, Plaid Cymru and the SNP, were defeated.

Sections 4 and 5 of the FTPA postponed the Scottish Parliament election and Senedd Cymru election respectively that would have been held on 7 May 2015, moving the election day to 5 May 2016 to avoid it coinciding with the general election in the United Kingdom.

== Critiques ==
=== Views of legal specialists ===
Robert Blackburn KC, a professor of constitutional law, stated that "the status and effect of a no-confidence motion remains largely as it was prior to the Act". Alastair Meeks, however, a lawyer writing on the PoliticalBetting.com website, argued that, as well as removing the Prime Minister's ability to set an election date at a time of their choosing, the FTPA significantly affected the British constitution. It removed the ability of the Prime Minister to make a vote on a policy a matter of confidence in the government, a tool that minority governments and governments with small majorities have used to ensure that legislation is passed in the House of Commons. This put such governments at risk of remaining in power without an adequate ability to legislate, increasing the necessity of coalition government.

David Allen Green, a lawyer and journalist, and Andrew Blick, a legal academic, argued that the FTPA changed little in practice, since the Prime Minister could still, so long as a sufficient portion of the Opposition agreed, schedule an election at their pleasure. Blick also argued that the use of a supermajority requirement for the House of Commons, which is very rare in UK law, represented a move towards entrenched clauses in the UK Constitution.

In 2017 Blick argued alongside Graham Allen, who chaired the House of Commons Select Committee on Political and Constitutional Reform during passage of the FTPA, that the FTPA had failed "to deliver on one of its main stated purposes ... to reduce the discretion possessed by the Prime Minister in being able to determine the date of general elections". Allen and Blick argued, however, that this was an "admirable objective" and proposed that instead of being repealed the FTPA should be amended to provide additional safeguards.

=== Views of politicians ===
During the passage of the FTPA, Graham Allen stated on second reading that his committee had not received ample notice for adequate scrutiny of the Bill and that there were "so many flaws in the Bill's drafting". It was also reported that Allen was critical that the committee had not had sufficient time to consider whether a four-year term would have been more appropriate than the five-year term stipulated in the FTPA. While he was still Chair of the Select Committee on Political and Constitutional Reform, Allen wrote an essay in favour of codifying all the prerogative powers, and referred to his experience in challenging the prerogative powers of war.

=== Views of political scientists ===
According to one political scientist, Colin Talbot, the FTPA made minority governments more stable than in the past, since events that previously might have forced a government out of power—such as defeat of a Queen's Speech or other important legislation, loss of supply, or a vote of no confidence in the Prime Minister rather than the government as a whole—cannot formally do so.

Lord Norton, a Conservative political scientist, argued that the FTPA significantly limited the Prime Minister's ability to obtain an early election, since the Opposition could prevent an election by voting against it. This was borne out in 2019, as the Opposition blocked Prime Minister Boris Johnson's attempt to hold early elections on several occasions. An Act of Parliament for an early election (the Early Parliamentary General Election Act 2019) was then passed, with Opposition support, by a simple majority.

=== Evidence to the House of Lords Constitution Committee (2019) ===
In September 2019 Junade Ali advised in written evidence to the House of Lords Constitution Committee that repeal of the FTPA should be pursued on the basis that, as A. V. Dicey noted, dissolution allows for the executive to appeal to the nation if it feels the House of Commons is no longer supported by the electors, allowing for the resolution of unforeseen constitutional crises by the electorate. Ali argued that "The very legislative chamber subject to dissolution being, in all circumstances, required to consent to such dissolution removes essential oversight in a sovereign Parliament that can make or unmake any law whatsoever". Ali reiterated his argument that even if the FTPA had codified prorogation powers, the executive could instead seek refusal of Royal Assent until an early election was called, which, Ali argues, "would likely cause far greater constitutional outrage" and codification would "threaten to transform political into constitutional crises" This view was supported in a submission by Robert Craig, who stated: "The main justification for the Act appears to reside in an erroneous view that the political power to call an election is inappropriate in a political constitution."

=== Joint Committee on the Fixed-Term Parliaments Act (2020–21) ===
A cross-party parliamentary Joint Committee on the Fixed-Term Parliaments Act, including 14 members of the Commons and 6 peers, was established on 27 November 2020 to review the operation of the Act and make recommendations as to its repeal or amendment. Its report, published on 24 March 2021, concluded that the Act was flawed in several respects: the supermajority requirement imposed by the Act, the committee argued, risks "parliamentary gridlock" and "lacks credibility", as shown by the special legislation passed to circumvent the Act in 2019; the Act unduly circumscribed the powers of the Leader of the Opposition to bring forward motions of no confidence and of the government to declare issues to be matters of confidence; finally, the Act's definition of the 14-day period following successful motions of no confidence was unsatisfactory and may have allowed a government to force an election even in cases where an alternative government could be formed from the existing Parliament. The chair of the committee, Conservative Lord McLoughlin, described the FTPA as "likely to be a short-lived constitutional experiment".

== Implementation ==
=== Election held after a full five-year term on date fixed by section 1 of the FTPA ===
The 2015 general election held on 7 May 2015 was the only use of the FTPA to dictate the date of a general election.

=== Election held after a two-thirds Commons majority for dissolution by section 2(1) of the FTPA ===
On 18 April 2017, Prime Minister Theresa May announced her intention to call a general election for 8 June 2017, bringing the United Kingdom's 56th Parliament to an end after two years and 32 days. The FTPA permitted this, but required two-thirds of the Commons (at least 434 MPs) to support the motion to allow it to be passed. Jeremy Corbyn, then the Leader of the Opposition and the Labour Party indicated that he was in support of an election. The motion was passed the following day by 522 votes to 13 votes.

As the FTPA required that general elections take place on the first Thursday in May, the date of the next general election after the 2017 election (assuming that no earlier elections were called) would have been 5 May 2022, meaning that the term would have been one month short of five years.

=== Motions that did not result in an election ===
==== 2018 proposed motion of no confidence in the Prime Minister ====
On 17 December 2018, the Labour Party tabled a motion of no confidence in the Prime Minister, Theresa May. As this was not a motion of no confidence in Her Majesty's Government in the form set out in the FTPA, its passing would not have resulted in a general election being called. Arguing that this would have no effect because of the FTPA, May was able to call it a stunt and deny it any time for debate.

The SNP, the Liberal Democrats, Plaid Cymru and the Green Party submitted an amendment to the motion that, if passed, would have changed the motion to meet the requirements of the FTPA. The government subsequently announced that the motion would not be given parliamentary time.

The following day, 18 December 2018, the SNP, the Liberal Democrats, Plaid Cymru and the Green Party tabled a new motion of no confidence in the Government in the form set down in the FTPA. This was the first such motion to be tabled under the terms of the FTPA.

==== 2019 motion of no confidence in the government ====
Jeremy Corbyn, then the Leader of the Opposition, tabled a motion of no confidence in Her Majesty's Government on 15 January 2019, after the House of Commons rejected Theresa May's draft agreement on Brexit. Ian Blackford, the Westminster leader of the SNP supported the decision. The motion failed, the ayes having 306 and the noes 325. Nigel Dodds, Westminster leader of the DUP, which had a confidence and supply agreement with the government, expressed the opinion that it was in the national interest for his party to support the government in the motion.

==== 2019 motions for a general election ====
Boris Johnson's government attempted three times to call an early general election by means of section 2(2) of the FTPA. Each motion achieved a simple majority, but did not meet the two-thirds requirement because opposition parties abstained. Eventually Parliament passed the Early Parliamentary General Election Act 2019.

===== First motion =====
On 3 September 2019, the government tabled a motion under the FTPA to trigger an early general election, requiring the votes of two-thirds of MPs. However, Labour refused to support the motion until legislation to delay a no-deal Brexit had been passed. On 4 September, there were 298 votes for the motion and 56 against, with 288 abstentions, well short of the two-thirds supermajority required. On 6 September, four opposition parties – Labour, the Liberal Democrats, the SNP and Plaid Cymru – agreed not to support any parliamentary vote for a general election until after the next meeting of the European Council, which was scheduled for 17–18 October 2019.

===== Second motion =====
On 9 September, another motion for an early election was tabled by the government. It failed by 293 votes to 46, with 303 abstentions

Parliament was prorogued on the same day, until 14 October. The prorogation was later deemed unlawful by the Supreme Court and proceedings were resumed on 25 September.

===== Third motion =====
On 24 October 2019, Prime Minister Boris Johnson announced his intention to call a general election via a motion under the FTPA to be tabled on 28 October. Jeremy Corbyn, then Leader of the Opposition, indicated that he would support an election only if Johnson pledged to take a no-deal Brexit off the table. On 28 October, the motion failed despite a vote of 299 to 70 because mass abstentions by the opposition prevented the forming of the two-thirds majority required under the FTPA.

No further motions under the FTPA were attempted in the 2017–19 Parliament, as Prime Minister Boris Johnson introduced the Early Parliamentary General Election Act 2019 to the House of Commons on the same day, which triggered an election after it was passed.

== Circumvention in the 2019 general election ==
The Early Parliamentary General Election Act 2019 was introduced on 29 October 2019 by Boris Johnson following the failure to secure an election by a two-thirds majority the previous day. The bill was fast-tracked through the House of Commons on the same day it was introduced, the following day Baroness Evans of Bowes Park (Leader of the House of Lords) introduced the bill in the House of Lords and it received its First Reading. The bill completed all stages the following day (30 October) without amendment and was presented to the Queen for royal assent. In accordance with the Royal Assent Act 1967, at 4:27 PM on 31 October, royal assent was notified to the House of Lords and notified in the House of Commons at 4:35 PM. The bill became law within three days from introduction to royal assent, an uncommonly short time.

The act circumvented the FTPA to provide for a general election on 12 December:

1 Early parliamentary general election

(1) An early parliamentary general election is to take place on 12 December 2019 in consequence of the passing of this Act.
(2) That day is to be treated as a polling day appointed under section 2(7) of the Fixed-term Parliaments Act 2011.

At 12:01 AM on 6 November, Parliament was dissolved, as the FTPA required that dissolution must happen 25 days before a general election with all seats in the House of Commons becoming vacant.

The 2019 act referred to the FTPA but did not amend it. The FTPA remained in force unaltered until its repeal in 2022; the effect of the 2019 act was only to interrupt its operation. The two acts did not legally conflict, owing to the British constitutional principle of parliamentary sovereignty, that Parliament has "the right to make or unmake any law whatever", and constitutional laws are of no different status.

== Other effects ==
In 2016, in the wake of the Panama Papers scandal, a petition was created on the Parliament petitions website that called for a general election after Prime Minister David Cameron revealed that he had had investments in an offshore trust. After the petition had passed the threshold of 100,000 signatures, the government response cited the Fixed-term Parliaments Act in its reply, and stated that "no Government can call an early general election any more anyway".

In 2017, the journalist John Rentoul writing in The Independent newspaper argued that the Fixed-term Parliaments Act indirectly caused the election loss of Theresa May's majority in the 2017 election. Technicalities made her choose an election campaign of seven weeks, 2–3 weeks longer than usual, which, Rentoul argued, lost her the majority.

Losing the parliamentary vote that follows a speech from the throne (also known as a King's or Queen's Speech) has traditionally been seen as having the same consequences for a government as losing a vote of no confidence. Although this was not the case under the Act, the consequences of losing a vote on the Queen's speech were still considered significant. Theresa May delayed the Queen's speech that was expected in spring 2019, partly as a result of concerns about the prospects for winning a parliamentary vote on it.

== Repeal ==
=== Proposals for repeal and replacement ===
The Conservative Party manifesto at the 2017 general election proposed repealing the Fixed-term Parliaments Act 2011. However, Theresa May's government failed to win a House of Commons majority at that election and did not attempt to repeal the act. The Conservative Party reiterated the commitment to repeal the act in its manifesto for the December 2019 election, at which it won a majority. The manifesto stated that the Act "has led to paralysis at a time the country needed decisive action". The first Queen's Speech following the election confirmed that "work will be taken forward to repeal the Fixed-term Parliaments Act".

Lord Norton of Louth had commented in 2016 that repealing the Act would require a new Act of Parliament, and that if the duration of parliaments was to be limited, arrangements for this would need to be included in the new Act because the Fixed-term Parliaments Act 2011 had repealed pre-existing legislation governing the duration of parliaments.

==== 2020 private member's bill ====
After the December 2019 election, on 3 February 2020, a private member's bill to repeal and replace the FTPA was introduced in the House of Lords by Conservative peer Lord Mancroft. The bill would have established five-year parliaments, the next election to be on 2 May 2024, unless an early election is called by royal proclamation dissolving Parliament. This would have substantially restored the position before the FTPA. Additionally, the bill would have confirmed that the monarch has power to prorogue Parliament until a time of the monarch's choosing. Under the bill, the monarch's actions, and government advice to the monarch about those actions, would not have been justiciable. A second reading was not scheduled for the bill, which failed with the prorogation of Parliament on 29 April 2021.

=== Proposals for reform ===
Since the Act abolished the old prerogative powers, for example the royal power of dissolution, some legal experts such as Raphael Hogarth argued that it would not be possible simply to revive them even if that were desired. The Act might instead have been reformed, in particular to specify what steps should occur during what has been called the "messy fortnight" after a motion under the Act is passed and to clarify whether pre-existing types of vote amounting to no confidence, such as rejection of the Budget, continued to require a government's resignation.

This position was rejected in 2020 by the government, which opted to explicitly revive the royal prerogative in its draft legislation repealing the Act. Whether this would in fact constitute a restoration of the prerogative or the creation of a new statutory power is debated by legal experts, with former Supreme Court judges Baroness Hale and Lord Sumption arguing that the prerogative could be revived, constitutional law professor Anne Twomey that it could not, and Stephen Laws, a former First Parliamentary Counsel, stating that "if Parliament wants the power to be the same as it was before 2011, then it is the duty of the courts to see it as such".

=== Dissolution and Calling of Parliament Act 2022 ===
The government published on 1 December 2020, for consideration by the parliamentary Joint Committee on the FTPA, a draft Fixed-term Parliaments Act 2011 (Repeal) Bill which would repeal and replace the FTPA. The draft, accompanied by a statement of the underlying principles, provides for revival of the royal prerogative powers as to dissolution of parliament and summoning of a new parliament "as if the Fixed-term Parliaments Act 2011 had never been enacted", with the effect of restoring maximum five-year parliaments. It adds (which is new) that a court "may not question" (a) the "exercise or purported exercise" of those powers, (b) "any decision or purported decision relating to those powers" or (c) "the limits or extent of those powers". Retitled the Dissolution and Calling of Parliament Bill, it was announced formally in the Queen's Speech of 11 May 2021 and introduced to Parliament the following day. The Dissolution and Calling of Parliament Act was granted royal assent on 24 March 2022, repealing the Fixed Term Parliaments Act and the Early Parliamentary General Election Act 2019 as part of the act's provisions.

== See also ==
- Elections Act 2022
- Legislative session
