= Elections in the United Kingdom =

There are five types of elections in the United Kingdom: elections to the House of Commons of the United Kingdom (commonly called 'general elections' when all seats are contested), elections to devolved parliaments and assemblies (in Scotland, Wales, Northern Ireland, and London), local elections, mayoral elections (in England), and police and crime commissioner elections (in England and Wales). Within each of those categories, there may also be by-elections. Elections are held on Election Day, which is conventionally a Thursday, and under the provisions of the Dissolution and Calling of Parliament Act 2022 the timing of general elections can be held at the discretion of the prime minister during any five-year period. All other types of elections are held after fixed periods, though early elections to the devolved assemblies and parliaments can occur in certain situations.

Five electoral systems are currently in use: the single member plurality system (first-past-the-post), multi-winner plurality block voting, multi-winner single transferable vote, the multi-winner additional member system (mixed-member proportional), and the single-winner supplementary vote.

Elections are administered locally: in each lower-tier local authority, the polling procedure is operated by the returning officer or acting returning officer, and the compiling and maintenance of the electoral roll by the electoral registration officer (except in Northern Ireland, where the Electoral Office for Northern Ireland assumes both responsibilities). The Electoral Commission sets standards for and issues guidelines to returning officers and electoral registration officers, and is responsible for nationwide electoral administration (such as the registration of political parties and directing the administration of national referendums).

== Electoral registration ==
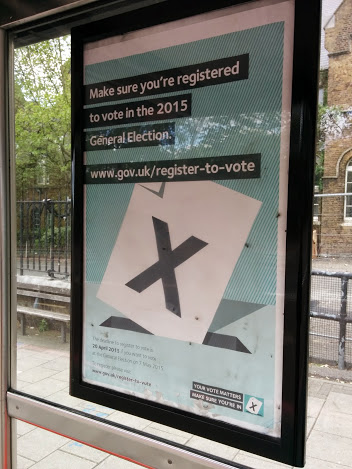
Advertisement in London publicised by the Electoral Commission encouraging voter registration ahead of the 2015 general election

The total number of names in the United Kingdom appearing in Electoral Registers published on 1 December 2010 and based on a qualifying date of 15 October 2010 was 45,844,691.

=== Entitlement to vote ===
In England according to Representation of the People Act 1983, anyone who will be aged 18 or over on polling day and who is a national of any Commonwealth country, or Ireland, but excluding British protected persons, (Note: As the Representation of the People Act 1983 was enacted after the British Nationality Act 1981, any reference to 'Commonwealth citizen' is defined as a British citizen, a British overseas territories citizen, a British National (Overseas), a British overseas citizen, a British subject or a citizen of a country listed in Schedule 3 of the latter piece of legislation, but not a British protected person.) can apply to the electoral registration officer in the local authority area where they reside with a 'considerable degree of permanence' to be listed in that area's Electoral Register.

In Scotland and Wales, those fulfilling the nationality requirements (as stated in the previous paragraph), or who otherwise hold leave to remain (limited or indefinite) in the UK, who will be aged 16 or over on polling day can register to vote, as the age for voting in the Scottish Parliament and the Senedd respectively, and local elections in both countries is 16. However, voters in Scotland and Wales under 18 are not entitled to vote in UK general elections as the rules for voting for MPs differ.

A person can still register at their ordinary address if they will be away temporarily (for example, away working, on holiday, in student accommodation or in hospital). A person who has two homes (such as a university student who has a term-time address and lives at home during holidays) may be able to register to vote at both addresses as long as they are not in the same electoral area (though an elector can only vote once in any single election or referendum).

In addition, to qualify to appear on the Electoral Register, applicants who are Commonwealth citizens must either possess leave to enter or remain in the UK or not require such leave on the date of their application and no applicant may be a convicted person detained in prison or a mental hospital (or unlawfully at large if they would otherwise have been detained) or a person found guilty of certain corrupt or illegal practices.

In Northern Ireland, from 1949 until 2014, a minimum of three months’ residency in the territory was required for registration. This requirement was removed in the Northern Ireland (Miscellaneous Provisions) Act 2014.

Remand prisoners, voluntary patients in mental hospitals and people without a fixed place of residence can register to vote by making a declaration of local connection.

Members of HM Forces and their immediate family members have the option of registering as a service voter, by making a service declaration based on their last UK address.

British citizens (but not other categories of British nationals) residing outside the United Kingdom can register as an overseas voter provided that they were on the Electoral Register in the UK within the previous 15 years. The 15-year period begins when they no longer appeared in the electoral register, not the date they moved abroad. British citizens who moved abroad before they turned 18 years old can still qualify for registration, with the 15-years period calculated from the date their parent(s)/guardian ceased to appear in the Electoral Register. Overseas voters can only vote in UK parliamentary elections in the constituency of their last registered UK address (or for those who moved abroad as a minor, the last registered UK address of their parent(s)/guardian). British citizens who are away overseas temporarily do not need to register as overseas electors and can register to vote at their UK address. The right for overseas voters to vote in UK elections was revised in 2024; both the 15-year limitation and also the requirement to have already been on an electoral register were removed. A revised online registration procedure for voters (including overseas voters) was implemented on 16 January 2024.

Crown servants and British Council employees (as well as their spouses who live abroad) employed in a post outside the UK can register by making a Crown Servant declaration, allowing them to vote in all UK elections.

An individual can register as an anonymous elector if his/her safety (or that of any other person in the same household) would be at risk were his/her name and address to be disclosed publicly on the Electoral Register, but the application needs to be supported by a relevant court order, injunction or an attestation by a chief police officer or a Director of Social Services.

The right of Commonwealth and Irish citizens to vote is a legacy of the Representation of the People Act 1918, which limited the vote to British subjects. At that time, "British subjects" included the people of Ireland — then part of the United Kingdom of Great Britain and Ireland — and all other parts of the British Empire. Though most of Ireland (see Ireland Act 1949) and the majority of the colonies became independent nations, their citizens have retained the right to vote if they live in the United Kingdom.

In theory, members of the Royal Family who are not members of the House of Lords (including those who are peers who lost their right to sit following the House of Lords Act 1999) are eligible to vote, although in practice they do not exercise that right.

=== Registration procedure ===
In Great Britain, most electors are enrolled during the course of the annual canvass, which electoral registration officers are obliged to conduct every year between August and November. Canvass forms are sent to all households, and must be returned, otherwise a fine of £1000 can be imposed. One person in the household must confirm the details of all residents who are existing electors, which includes adding or deleting residents who have moved in or out and are eligible to register to vote.

Between December and early August, the rolling registration procedure applies instead. Applications must be submitted individually (unlike the annual canvass forms where one person is responsible for registering all eligible people in a household) using registration forms available from local electoral registration officers or the Electoral Commission's website. Although no proof of identity or address is necessary when submitting an application, the electoral registration officer can require the applicant to provide further information regarding the applicant's age, nationality, residence and whether or not they are disqualified and/or evidence to prove the applicant's age and/or nationality. Application forms can be returned to the local electoral registration officer by post, by fax or by e-mail as a scanned attachment.

As of June 2014, as part of the Government's Digital By Default policy, voters in England and Wales can register to the electoral roll online.

Special category electors do not register through the annual canvass procedure. Instead, they submit applications at any time during the year and have to renew their electoral application periodically (every one year for overseas electors and voters with a declaration of local connection and every three years for service voters).

Applications are received by the electoral registration officer. The officer adds them to a list of applications (unless they are applications to register as an anonymous elector). The list is open for inspection for five working days, during which any other elector may raise an objection to an application. The electoral registration officer can initiate an application hearing if there are reasonable integrity concerns about the application.

In Northern Ireland, there is no annual canvass, and instead people register individually at any time during the year. Applicants must supply their National Insurance number or, if they do not have one, make a declaration to that effect. Proof of identity, address, three months' residency in NI and date of birth must also be included with applications, which are submitted by post to the Electoral Office for Northern Ireland.

Knowingly giving false information to an electoral registration officer anywhere in the UK is an offence with a maximum penalty, upon conviction, of £5,000 and/or six months' imprisonment.

=== Electoral Register ===
Each district council or unitary authority has an Electoral Register which is compiled by the electoral registration officer listing all registered electors. The Electoral Register contains the name, qualifying address and electoral number of every ordinary elector, the name of every special category elector (such as service voters) and the electoral number of every anonymous elector. Any elector who was not aged 18 yet at the time of registration will also have his/her date of birth printed. Each district's Electoral Register is subdivided into separate registers for each polling district.

Because the franchise differs between individual voters, various markers may be placed next to voters' names to identify in which elections they are entitled to vote. European Union citizens who are not Commonwealth or Irish citizens have their entry prefixed either with G or K (meaning they can only vote in local government elections). Overseas electors are prefixed with the letter F, meaning they can only vote in UK Parliamentary elections. Members of the House of Lords residing in the UK are prefixed with the letter L, meaning they can only vote in local government elections, whilst peers who are overseas electors are prefixed with the letter E, indicating that they could only have voted in European Parliamentary elections.

The register is published every year on 1 December after the annual canvass period (unless there has been an election during the annual canvass period between 1 July and 1 December, in which case the publication date is 1 February in the following year). However, in 2012, because the Police and Crime Commissioner elections were held on 15 November, the annual canvass in England and Wales (excluding London) was held between July and October and the Electoral Register was published on 16 October. Between January and September, during the 'rolling registration' period, notices of alteration are published on the first working day of each month to add, remove or amend names. Notices of alteration are also published 5 working days before an election at any time of the year and just before the close of poll at any election to correct any clerical errors or to implement any court decisions. With the exception of a deceased elector who is removed from the register, any individual who is added or removed from the register must be notified by the electoral registration officer.

There are two versions of the Register: the full register and the edited register. The full register can only be inspected under supervision at the office of the local electoral registration officer, and must be supplied free of charge to the district's returning officer, the British Library, the Electoral Commission, the Office for National Statistics (only English and Welsh Registers), the General Register Office for Scotland (only Scottish Registers), the National Library of Wales (only English and Welsh Registers), the National Library of Scotland (only English and Scottish Registers) and the relevant Boundary Commission. The edited register is available for general sale from electoral registration officers and can be used for any purpose. Electors can choose to opt out from appearing in the edited register by informing their local electoral registration officer.

== Party system ==
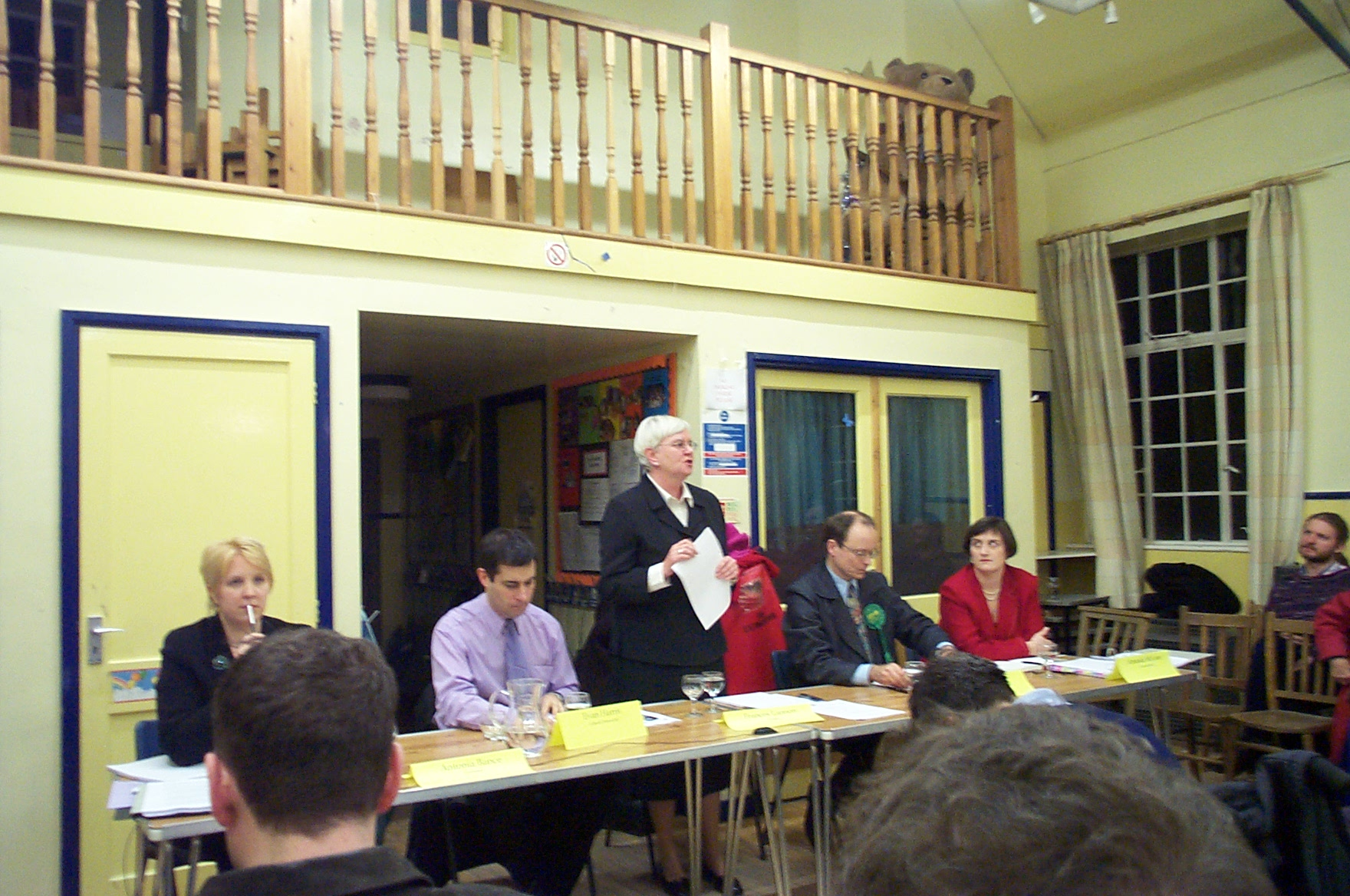
A pre-election husting at the Oxford West and Abingdon constituency, England.

Political parties are the dominant organisations in the modern UK political system. The majority of election candidates stand on behalf of political parties of varying sizes. All parties, however large or small, must be registered with the Electoral Commission to be able to operate and stand candidates. Parties must regularly report donations, loans and spending on national elections. Larger parties must also submit audited accounts on an annual basis.

Most parties will have an individual leader (some parties choose to nominate one or more "spokespersons" rather than having a "leader"). Leaders of the main parties will be those parties' "candidates" for the post of prime minister – though there is no formal position of "prime ministerial candidate" since the prime minister is appointed by the monarch rather than being elected directly. Where a party has members elected to a parliament, devolved assembly or local council, they will typically seek to follow a united position and maintain a disciplined group using the whip system.

Historically (until 2005, with the sole exception of 1923), the United Kingdom has effectively had a two-party system as a result of the First-Past-The-Post system used for general and local elections. Duverger's law certainly seems borne out in the history of British parliamentary politics. Before World War I, the United Kingdom had a true two-party system: the main parties were the Tories (which became the Conservative Party) and the Whigs (which became the Liberal Party), though after Catholic emancipation there was also a substantial Irish Parliamentary Party. After World War II, the dominant parties have been Conservative and Labour. No third party has come close to winning a parliamentary majority, although Johnston et al. wrote of the elections from 1950 to 1997, "Increasingly, a number of smaller (or third) parties has won a substantial proportion of the votes cast." Third parties and smaller parties have always polled at least 20% of the vote between them since the 1980s, while the Liberal Democrats won 62 of the 646 seats in the House of Commons in 2005, which led some spectators to regard the Westminster Parliament as a "two and a half" party system.

More recently, in 2010 the share of the vote for the two largest parties fell to 65%, with seats won by several other parties, including nationalist parties. In 2015, televised election debates included leaders of up to seven different parties. In the general election, the Scottish National Party (SNP) won over 90% of Scottish constituencies, to become the third party in terms of seats in the House of Commons. At the same time, the UK Independence Party won nearly 13% of the UK vote (more than double the UK-wide share obtained by the SNP) to finish third in terms of popular support, yet they won only one seat. In 2024, the combined vote share for Labour and the Conservatives fell further to 57%, a record low, while the smaller parties saw record support at 43%. The election was highly disproportionate with Labour winning 63% of seats (411) with 33.7% of the vote, while Reform UK won 0.8% of seats (5) with 14.3% of the vote. Meanwhile, the Liberal Democrats remain the third largest political party in the House of Lords, with over 100 seats.

Smaller parties receive a higher proportion of votes, and a much higher proportion of seats, in those elections which use some form of proportional system: i.e. the regional elections for the Scottish Parliament, the Senedd, Northern Ireland Assembly and London Assembly. Parties, such as Reform, the SNP, Plaid Cymru, and the Green Parties perform better in these elections, which can therefore be considered to produce a multi-party system.

It is relatively easy to stand for election as an independent candidate, although wins are rare and usually involve special circumstances (for example Martin Bell's 1997 victory against the discredited Conservative MP Neil Hamilton was aided by the major parties standing aside and not contesting the election). Following the 2005 General Election there were three independent MPs, the highest number since 1945, however only one of these was returned in the 2010 election.

=== Parliamentary candidate selection ===
Almost any registered elector is entitled to stand for election to parliament, provided they are able to submit nomination forms signed by ten voters from the constituency they wish to contest, along with a £500 deposit (which is returned to the candidate after the election if they poll more than 5% of the vote). The selection of candidates standing for political parties is the responsibility of the party itself, and all parties follow different procedures. Per the Registration of Political Parties Act 1998, political party candidates must be authorised to stand for election for their party by their party's "nominating officer", or someone authorised in writing by the nominating officer. The three largest parties, the Conservative Party, Labour Party, and Liberal Democrats, have centrally-approved lists of candidates.

In the Conservative Party, constituency associations select their constituency's candidates. Some associations have organised open parliamentary primaries. A Constituency Association must choose a candidate using the rules approved by, and (in England, Wales and Northern Ireland) from a list established by, the Committee on Candidates of the Board of the Conservative Party. Prospective candidates apply to the Conservative Central Office to be included on the approved list of candidates, some candidates will be given the option of applying for any seat they choose, while others may be restricted to certain constituencies. A Conservative MP can only be deselected at a special general meeting of the local Conservative association, which can only be organised if backed by a petition of more than fifty members.

In the Labour Party, the Constituency Labour Parties (CLP) select the parliamentary general election candidates using procedures agreed by the National Executive Committee (NEC). The selection will always involve a "one member, one vote" ballot where all members of the CLP are entitled to select their candidate from a shortlist. The methods used to draw up the shortlist will vary according to the structure of the CLP, the time available before the election, and the number of candidates who express an interest in the selection. All selected candidates must attend and pass an interview conducted on behalf of the NEC - most candidates will do this before starting to apply for selections, though the interview can occur after a candidate is selected. Different procedures apply when a sitting Labour MP indicates they wish to stand for re-selection. On rare occasions, the NEC may withdraw their endorsement of a candidate (including sitting MPs) after the selection process is complete. They exercised this power with regards to some of the MPs involved in the expenses scandal prior to the 2010 General Election.

The Liberal Democrats operate an assessment process for members wishing to join the party's list of potential candidates. Once on the list, candidates are free to apply for selection in any constituency. The candidate in each seat is selected by local party members following a hustings.

UKIP, the Scottish National Party and Plaid Cymru select their candidates in a similar manner to the Liberal Democrats.

The Green Party's selections are open to all members to apply. Applicants are not shortlisted, so local parties vote directly on the full list of applicants.

== Polling procedure ==
All voters must be listed on the electoral register, even if the person is otherwise qualified to vote. If, because of a clerical error, someone's name has been left off the electoral register (even though a correctly completed application form was submitted by the deadline), the electoral registration officer can amend the register up to 9pm on polling day. Because the franchise between electors varies (for example, EU citizens who are not Commonwealth or Irish citizens cannot vote in UK parliamentary elections) ballot papers are only issued after checking the marker in the electoral register before an elector's name to identify in which elections the individual is eligible to vote.

Votes can be cast either in person at a polling station, by post or by proxy. British citizens residing abroad and registered as overseas electors cannot vote at British high commissions, embassies or consulates - their votes can only be cast either in person in the constituency where they are enrolled in the United Kingdom, by proxy (who must reside in and be eligible to vote in the UK) or by post (although this option is less popular as postal ballot packs are only despatched by returning officers at 4pm, 19 working days before polling day at the earliest and must be received by the returning officer by the close of poll to be counted).

=== In person ===
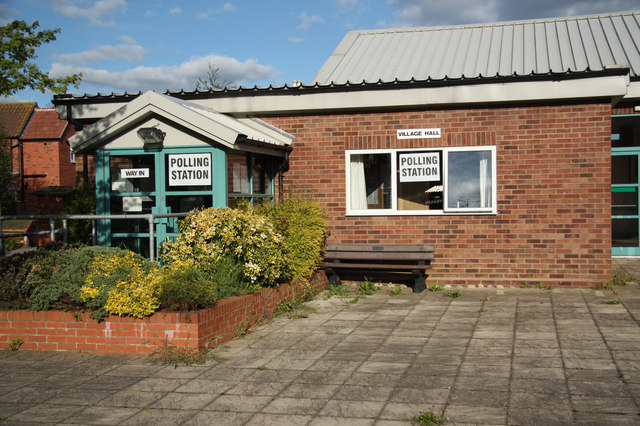
Village hall converted into a polling station for the 2010 United Kingdom general election.

Polling stations (also known as polling places) are open from 7am to 10pm on polling day. Voters receive a poll card from the returning officer at their local authority with details of their allocated polling place. They are not required to show their poll card (unless they are an anonymous elector) but following the passing of the Elections Act 2022, one piece of photographic ID (current or expired) must be presented at the polling station at general elections in the whole United Kingdom, as well as local elections in England. This was already the case in Northern Ireland prior to the 2022 act, where any one of the following types of ID was valid - a NI Electoral Identity Card, a photographic NI or GB or other EEA driving licence, a British or other EU passport, a Translink 60+ SmartPass, a Translink Senior SmartPass, a Translink Blind Person's SmartPass or a Translink War Disabled SmartPass. Now, in all of the UK, valid ID forms are a British or other EU passport, a photographic UK or other EEA driving licence, a PASS card, a Blue Badge, a Biometric residence permit, a defence identity card, an HM Armed Forces Veteran Card, a British or EEA National identity card, a NI Electoral Identity Card, a Voter Authority Certificate, and an Anonymous Elector’s Document.

At 7am when the poll opens, the presiding officer must show the empty ballot box to those who are present inside the polling station, before closing and sealing it.

Having verified and marked off the voter's name and address on the list of electors, the presiding officer or poll clerk issues the ballot paper, calling out the voter's name, elector number and polling district reference, unless the voter is an anonymous elector, in which case only his/her elector number is called out. Ballot papers cannot be issued before 7am and can only be issued after 10pm to a voter who was present in the queue at/outside the polling station at 10pm. All ballot papers contain both an official mark (e.g. a watermark or perforation) and a unique identifying number; any papers issued without both these features (even if it is the presiding officer/poll clerk's mistake) will be invalid and rejected at the count. On a separate list (called the corresponding number list) the presiding officer or poll clerk writes the voter's elector number next to the unique identifying number of the ballot paper issued. However, the secrecy of the vote is usually maintained, as at the close of the poll this list linking voters to their ballot paper numbers is sealed inside a packet which may only be opened by the order of a court if the election result is challenged. The ballot paper is folded and then handed to the voter.

The voter marks the ballot papers in the privacy of a voting booth. Polling stations must provide a writing implement for voters; usually pencils are provided (for practical reasons, as ink pens may dry out or spill), but there is no legal requirement for voters to mark their ballot papers with a pencil (they can use their own pen instead). If the ballot paper has been spoilt, the presiding officer/poll clerk can issue a new one after the old ballot paper is cancelled. Before placing the ballot papers in the ballot box, the voter has (in theory) to show the presiding officer or the poll clerk the official mark and the unique identifying number printed on the reverse of the ballot papers.

If a voter requests a ballot paper but someone has already voted in their name, or they are listed as having requested a postal vote, they can only cast a tendered ballot. After marking the tendered ballot in private, the voter must not place it in the ballot box. Instead, it must be returned to the presiding officer who will endorse it with the voter's name, elector number and polling district reference, before placing it in a special envelope. The voter's name and elector number is then written down in the 'List of Tendered Votes'. Although tendered ballots are not included at the count, they serve as a formal record that a voter has tried, but has been unable, to cast a vote and is evidence of a voter's concern about the conduct of an election. If a voter wants to make a complaint, marking a tendered ballot is the first step in pursuing the complaints procedure.

Voters may bring their underage children with them inside the polling station, but they may only observe the voting procedure and are not permitted to participate (for example, by marking the voter's ballot paper).

The presiding officer and the poll clerk(s) are responsible for maintaining order in the polling station (this includes ensuring that candidates/agents/tellers in the vicinity of the polling station do not interfere with the election process and/or impede voters' access to/from the polling station, and removing any campaign literature from inside the polling station) and ensuring the secrecy and security of all ballots cast. They are under a duty to act impartially at all times.

Candidates may appoint polling agents to observe the voting process in polling stations. These are a type of Electoral observer, and must follow a code of practice to avoid influencing the election, or obtaining information that could predict the result.

Tellers are often present outside the polling station and record the elector number (as it appears on the Electoral Register and poll card) of those who have voted. Tellers volunteer on behalf of political parties (identifiable by their rosette), but have no legal or official status, and voters are not obliged to give them their elector number. By recording who has voted, tellers help their parties identify supporters who have not yet voted, so that they can be contacted and encouraged to vote, and offered assistance — such as transport to the polling station — if necessary.

At the close of poll, the slot at the top of the ballot box is sealed by the presiding officer or poll clerk (the election and polling agents appointed by candidates can also apply their own seals to the boxes) before being transported 'directly and without delay' by the presiding officer to the central counting location.

=== By post ===
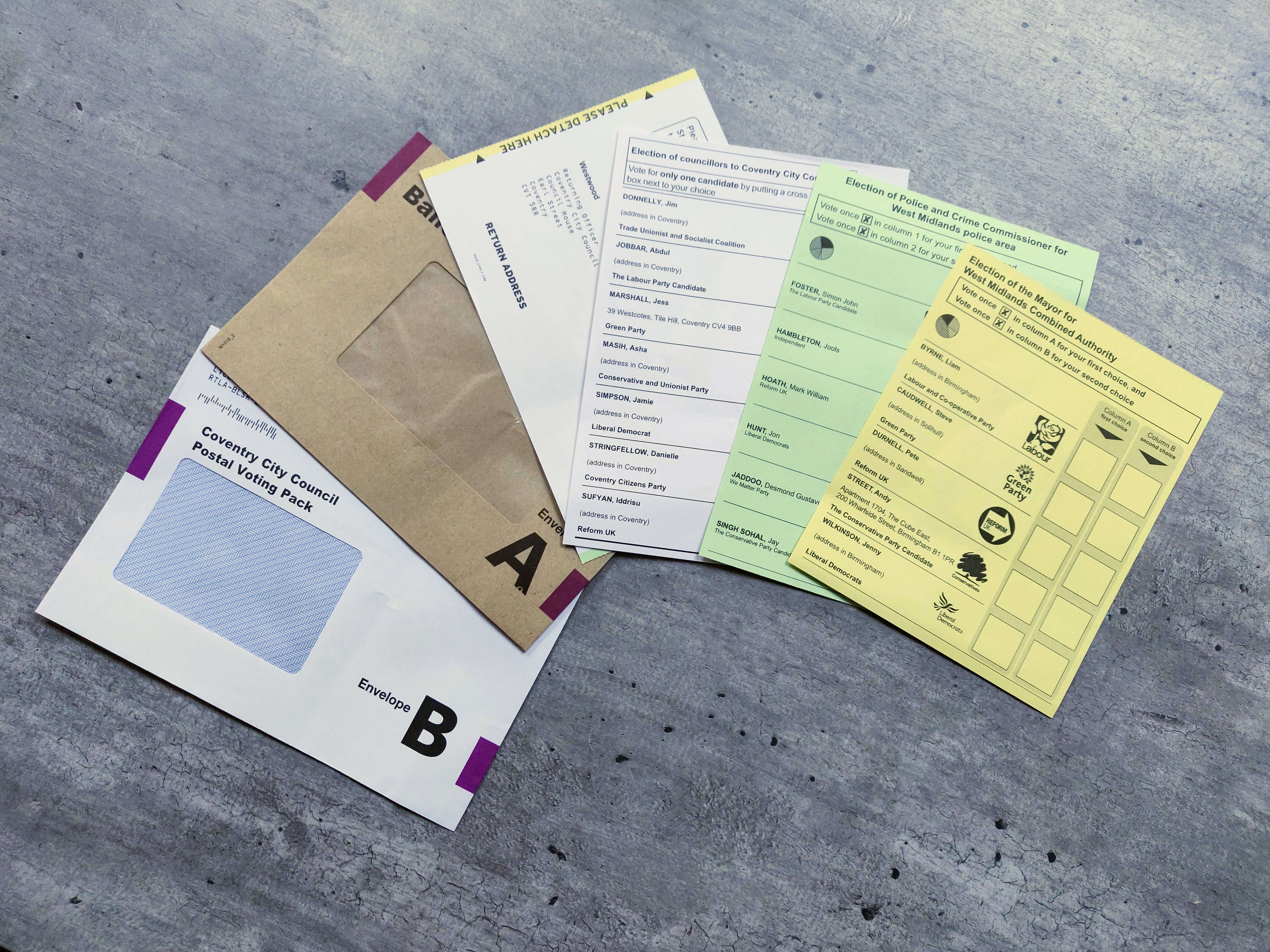
Postal voting pack received by a voter in Coventry for the 2021 United Kingdom local elections. The multiple ballots reflect the various concurrent elections the receiver was eligible to participate in.

Voters can apply to receive a postal ballot either for specific elections or on a permanent basis until further notice without having to give a reason (except in Northern Ireland, where voters have to give a specific reason explaining why they cannot physically attend their allocated polling station). Applications for postal ballots close at 5pm 11 working days before polling day. Postal ballots can be sent anywhere within and outside the United Kingdom, although if they are not sent to a voter's registered address, a reason must be provided to the electoral registration officer as to why the postal ballot is to be sent to an alternative address.

The returning officer must issue and send out postal ballot packs 'as soon as is practicable' (i.e. as soon as possible after the close of nominations at 4pm 19 working days before polling day).

Where an elector has applied for a postal ballot to be sent to an overseas address, the returning officer should prioritise the dispatch of their postal ballot packs (over those sent to UK addresses), send them by air mail and ensure that the postal ballot pack includes a return envelope with sufficient postage to be sent to the UK from abroad.

Voters return their postal ballots together with postal voting statements filled in with their date of birth and signature either by post or by hand directly to the returning officer, or by hand to the presiding officer on polling day at a polling station situated within the constituency/ward printed on the postal ballot return envelope. However, for the postal ballot to be counted, the returning officer (or the presiding officer if returned at a polling station) must receive the ballot paper by the close of poll (usually 10pm on polling day).

=== By proxy ===
Any person who is eligible to vote (he/she does not necessarily have to be on the Electoral Register already) can be appointed by another voter as his/her proxy, but for the proxy to be able to vote in an election the proxy application must be received by the electoral registration officer at the voter's local authority by 5pm 6 working days before polling day. The proxy can either vote in person, or can apply for a postal proxy vote (though a postal proxy vote application has an even earlier deadline - any such request must be received by the electoral registration officer by 5pm 11 working days before polling day at the latest). A voter who has become ill or disabled after 5pm six working days before polling day can make an emergency application to vote by proxy as long as the application is received by the electoral registration officer by 5pm on polling day. Unless a close relative, a person can only vote as a proxy on behalf of a maximum of two other voters in any single election in each constituency/ward. When applying to vote by proxy for more than one particular election, the application must be accompanied by a relevant attestation and must be justified based on one of the following reasons: blindness; other disability; employment; on an education course; registered as a service, overseas or anonymous elector. If only applying to vote by proxy for one particular election, the elector only needs to explain why he/she cannot vote in person, but does not need an attestation. If it is possible to get to the polling station from the registered address by only air or by sea, the elector can apply for a permanent proxy vote without an attestation.

In Northern Ireland, voters can only appoint another person to be their proxy if they can provide a specific reason explaining why they cannot physically attend their allocated polling station.

=== Accessibility ===
All polling stations are legally required to be wheelchair-accessible and be equipped with a tactile voting device and at least one large print display version of the ballot paper to assist visually impaired voters. Though the large print version cannot be marked, it can be used for reference. Disabled voters can also request the Presiding Officer in the polling station or bring along a family member to mark their ballot papers for them if they wish. If a voter is unable to enter the polling station because of a disability, the Presiding Officer can take the ballot paper to him/her.

Although the Electoral Commission provides electoral registration forms in a number of foreign languages, by law all voting materials (e.g. ballot papers) are only printed in English (and also in Welsh in Wales).

General election turnout from 1918 to 2019

== General elections ==
UK parliamentary election results, 1950–2024

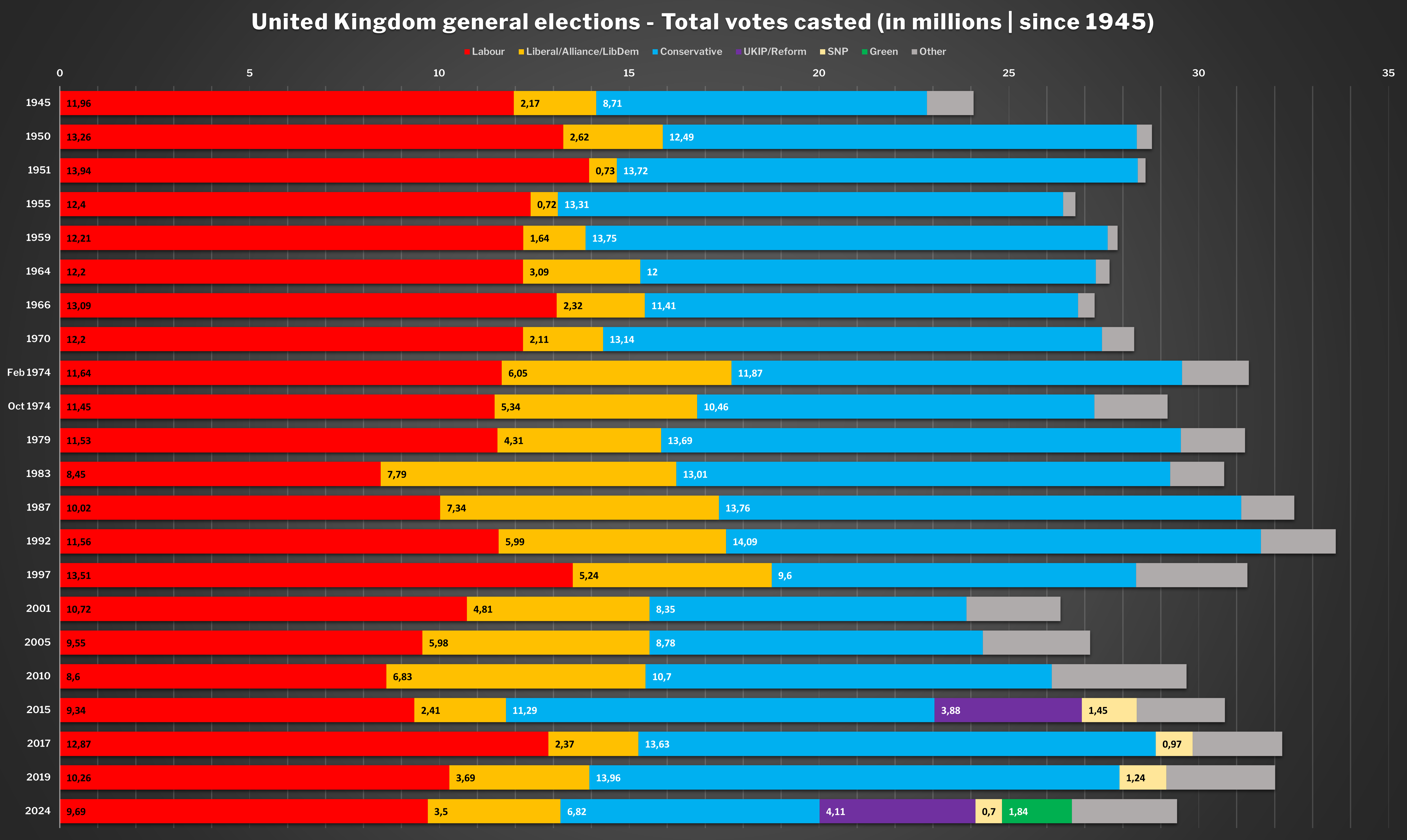
UK general elections by popular vote (in millions, since 1945).

United Kingdom general elections are held following a dissolution of Parliament. All the members of Parliament (MPs) forming the House of Commons of the Parliament of the United Kingdom are elected. Following the Dissolution and Calling of Parliament Act 2022, parliamentary terms last five years unless Parliament is dissolved sooner by the monarch at the prime minister's request. Under the Act, polling day occurs 25 working days after dissolution (previously, a minimum period of 17 working days applied). At this point, all parliamentary business ends and the role of MP ceases to exist until after polling day.

Candidates for each constituency are chosen by political parties or stand as independents. Almost all successful candidates are members of a political party, with only one independent elected in the 2010 election. Each constituency elects one MP by the first past the post system of election. At the 2005 general election, there were 646 constituencies, thus 646 MPs were elected to Parliament. At the 2017 election the number of MPs was 650.

A party with an overall parliamentary majority (more seats than all the other parties combined) following an election forms the government. If no party has an outright majority, parties can seek to form coalitions. At the 2010 election, even though the Conservatives won the greatest number of seats, it would have been possible for the Liberal Democrats to form a coalition with Labour (and maybe also other, smaller parties) instead of with the Conservatives. Situations such as these can give smaller parties considerable power: the eventual outcome of the 2010 election was effectively decided by the Liberal Democrats, while in 2017 the Conservatives lost their overall majority and had to rely on the Democratic Unionist Party (DUP) who held 10 seats to 'prop up' the minority conservative government in order to achieve the 326 seats needed for a majority government.

The largest party not in government forms His Majesty's Loyal Opposition. This is currently the Conservative Party.

=== Timing ===
A general election must take place before each parliamentary term begins. Since the maximum term of a parliament is five years, the interval between successive general elections can exceed that period by no more than the combined length of the election campaign and the time for the new parliament to assemble (a total of typically around four weeks). The five years runs from the first meeting of Parliament following the election.

After the 2010 general election, the coalition government enacted the Fixed-term Parliaments Act 2011 which set fixed-term parliaments of five years. Thus the next general election was held on 7 May 2015, with subsequent elections scheduled to be held every five years thereafter on the first Thursday in May. However the Act also contained provisions for Parliament to be dissolved and an early election held if no government can be formed within 14 days after a vote of no confidence in the government. Similarly, the Act allowed for an election to be triggered by a vote of two-thirds of MPs in the House of Commons calling for one. This provision of the act was used to trigger the 2017 United Kingdom general election. The Fixed-term Parliaments Act was repealed, reviving the prerogative powers of the monarch to dissolve and summon parliament, by the Dissolution and Calling of Parliament Act 2022 on 22 March 2022.

It is also possible for a general election to be triggered by a separate act of Parliament. This scenario happened in October 2019 when the then minority Government led by Boris Johnson, after three failed attempts to trigger an election through the two-thirds majority method, introduced the Early Parliamentary General Election Bill to by-pass the Fixed-term Parliaments Act. The Bill, which required only simple majority votes to pass each stage through the Houses of Parliament, stated that the next general election would be held on 12 December 2019. The Act received royal assent on 31 October 2019. However, since the passing of the Dissolution and Calling of Parliament Act 2022, it is extremely unlikely that this legal avenue will be used again, making the 2019 general election unique by being the only general election in UK electoral history to be triggered in this way.

The prime minister asks the monarch to dissolve Parliament by royal proclamation. The proclamation also orders the issue of the formal writs of election which require an election to be held in each constituency.

Since 1935 every general election has been held on a Thursday. Of the 19 general elections since 1945, six were held in May, five in June, four in October, two in February, and one each in March, April, July, and December. The 2019 general election was the first to be held in December since 1923.

The Cabinet Office imposes a pre-election period (originally known as purdah) before elections. This is a period of roughly six weeks in which Government Departments are not allowed to communicate with members of the public about any new or controversial Government initiatives (such as modernisation initiatives, and administrative and legislative changes).

=== Counts and declarations ===
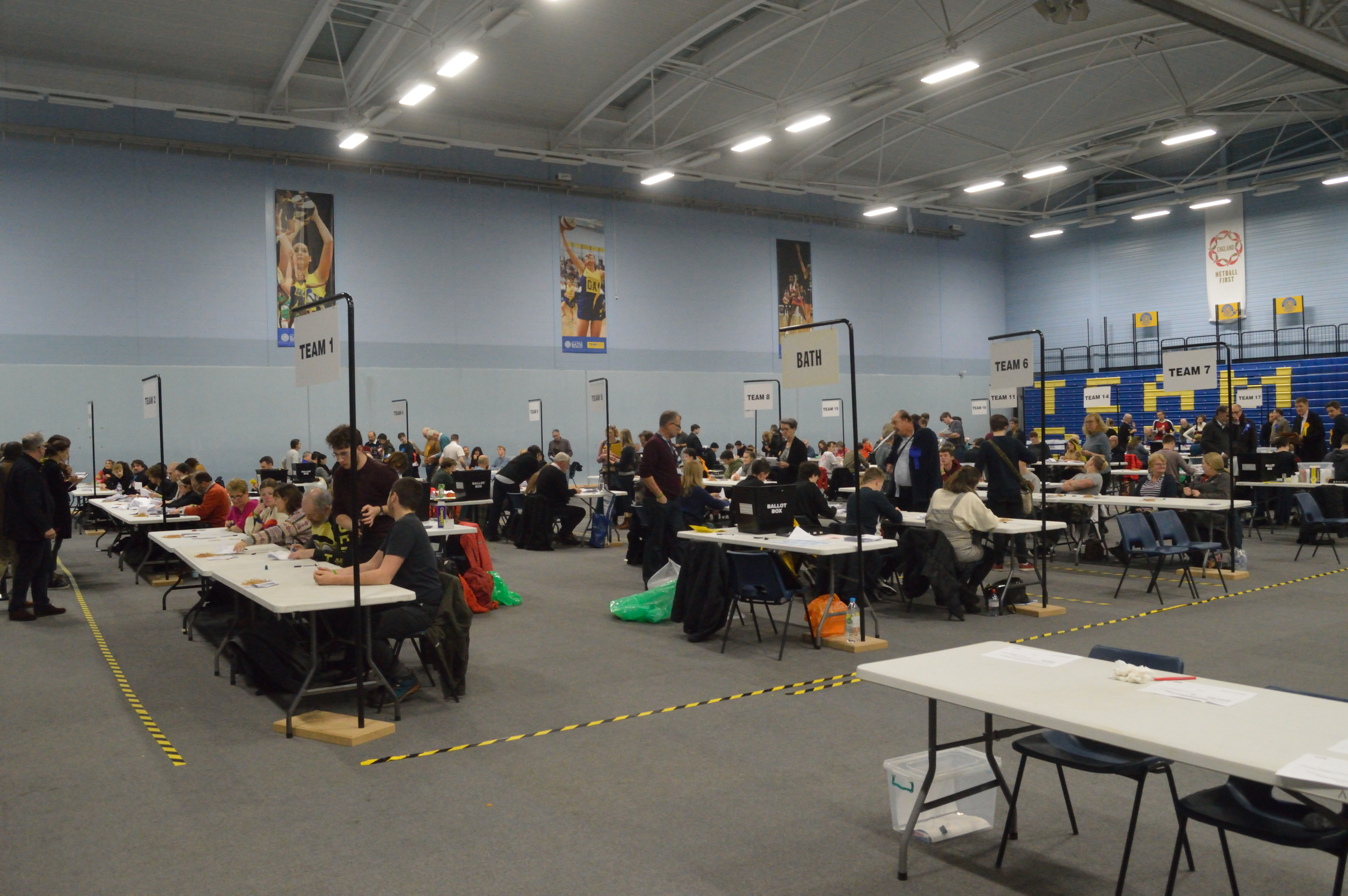
The count for the Bath 2019 general election, carried out in a sports hall which is a common count location

Voting ends at 10 pm (or once all voters present in a queue at or outside the polling station at 10 pm have cast their vote). Presiding officers are responsible for sealing ballot boxes in polling stations (election and polling agents appointed by candidates can also apply their own seals to the boxes) and transporting them 'directly and without delay' to the central counting location for the constituency. Multiple counts can take place at the same location, for example when a town is covered by two or more constituencies. Returning officers are required to "take reasonable steps to begin counting ... as soon as practicable within the period of four hours starting with the close of the poll" (i.e. no later than 2 am). In most constituencies, upon receipt by the returning officer at the central counting location, ballot boxes are unsealed and emptied, and ballot papers are verified and counted immediately. Ballot papers are verified manually and counted by hand. As with Polls and Postal Votes, the counting process is observed by Election Observers who may be individuals or nominated by e.g. parties.

The Representation of the People Act 1983 prohibits the publication of exit polls until voting has ended. In recent general elections, broadly accurate exit poll results have been announced by the major broadcasters at the stroke of 10 pm.

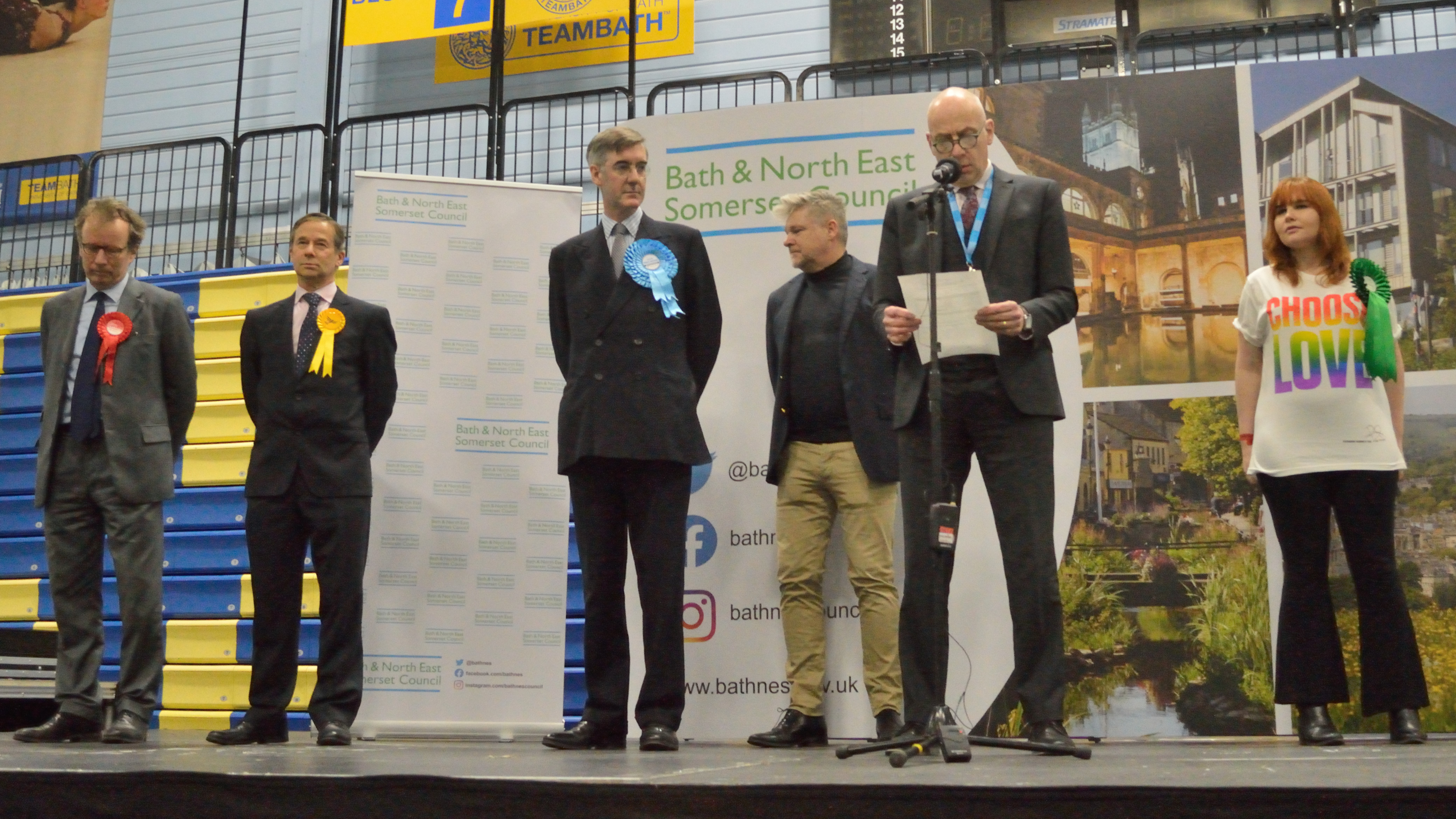
Declaration in the counting hall of the result for the North East Somerset constituency 2019 general election

Results are declared in each individual constituency by the local returning officer. National broadcasters are present at the majority of counts, particularly where there are high-profile candidates or close results expected. The earliest results are declared by about 11 pm, with most having been declared by 3 or 4 am; some constituencies do not declare their results until later the following day. Each individual MP assumes office immediately upon the declaration by the local returning officer.

=== Formation of a government ===
When all the results are known, or when one party achieves an absolute majority of the seats in the House of Commons, the first response comes from the current (and possibly outgoing) prime minister. If a majority in the new Parliament has been achieved by their party, they remain in office without the need for reconfirmation or reappointment—no new "term" of office is started. If a majority has not been achieved, and another party has the numbers to form a government, the prime minister submits his/her resignation to the Monarch. The Monarch then commissions the leader of the new majority party to form a new government. The prime minister can try to remain in power even without a majority. The subsequent King's Speech (giving an outline of the government's proposed legislative programme) offers a chance for the House of Commons to cast a vote of confidence or no confidence in the government by accepting or rejecting the King's Speech.

By precedent, and in the absence of any formal written constitutional objection, the monarch could in theory dismiss the incumbent prime minister and seek to appoint a replacement. However, this has not occurred since the dismissal of Lord Melbourne in 1834, and would almost certainly trigger a constitutional crisis, similar to the 1975 Australian constitutional crisis.

Once the result of a general election is known, the incumbent prime minister will make a statement regarding whether they will stay on as prime minister or not. When the outcome is decisive, in particular a majority either for their party or the opposition, they will make this announcement immediately, resigning if they lost. In the case of a hung parliament, they will remain as prime minister until one party either concludes a coalition agreement or decides to govern as a minority. Until that time, the monarch conventionally plays no role.

The most recent prime ministers who, having failed to win a majority, opted not to resign immediately, were Edward Heath in 1974, Gordon Brown in 2010, and Theresa May in 2017:

- In 1974, after initial negotiations with the Liberal Party failed to provide a coalition deal, the Conservative prime minister Edward Heath resigned, allowing Queen Elizabeth II to commission Labour leader Harold Wilson to form an administration.
- In 2010, the Conservative Party won a plurality of seats, but no majority. Incumbent Labour Prime Minister Gordon Brown remained in office until Conservative leader David Cameron agreed to form a governing coalition with the Liberal Democrats under Nick Clegg.
- In 2017, the Conservatives lost their majority, but still held a plurality of seats, yet no party was willing to form a coalition with them and Labour was unable to form a majority coalition of their own. Prime Minister Theresa May decided to carry on in a minority government after making a confidence and supply agreement with the Democratic Unionist Party.

The largest party not in government becomes the Official Opposition, known as His Majesty's Loyal Opposition. Any smaller parties not in government (or formally supporting it, such as in a confidence and supply agreement) are collectively known as "the opposition".

After each election, having remained in power, a prime minister may engage in a major or minor reshuffle of ministers; such a reshuffle may occur at any time if the prime minister wishes it. Any vacancy arising in the House, due to death, ennoblement, resignation, or recall, is filled by a by-election. The timing for this is not automatic and it can be months after the vacancy arose, or even abandoned if there is a general election due soon.

=== The media influence debate ===
The influence of media on elections in the UK – and elsewhere – is often a topic of debate, and overall, there seems to be little academic consensus. The often cited 'chicken and egg' or 'self-selection' problem makes it difficult to tell whether media outlets have an impact on their users' political affiliations, and ultimately, on what party they vote for: one can argue that users choose media outlets that fit their politics, or that their politics are moulded to fit the source of news they consume.

Multiple studies have attempted to sway the balance one way or the other; for instance, Newton and Brynin analysed voting patterns in the general elections of 1992 and 1997, and concluded that newspapers had a statistically significant effect on voting, larger for Labour than Conservative sympathizers, and larger for the 1992 than the 1997 election. Alternatively, Cowley reviewed The Observer's claims that it had encouraged tactical voting during the 1997 election by publishing poll results for 16 constituencies with a guide on how to vote tactically against the Conservatives; Cowley concluded that the newspaper had had little to no tangible impact on the result of the election in these constituencies.

When it comes to social media, the debate seems to be more about its effect on legality and fairness: the Conservative Party spent £1.2 million on Facebook during the UK 2015 general election campaign, which "enabled the party to target specific voters in marginal constituencies with tailored messages". Moore believes the sheer amount parties are spending on Facebook is itself proof of how 'central' digital media has become when it comes to political campaigning, but whether one believes online campaigning can encourage citizens to vote one way or another ("Brits believe traditional media mattered more in the 2017 general election"), the use of social media might be "compromising the principles of fair and open elections in the UK"; Moore uses the example of how Facebook algorithms helped the Conservative Party bypass spending limits by assigning constituency-specific expenses to the national budget in 2015. The "potential for fraud, lies and disproportionate influence", says a Guardian editorial advocating for new digital campaigning legislation, is "only too obvious".

=== Previous results ===
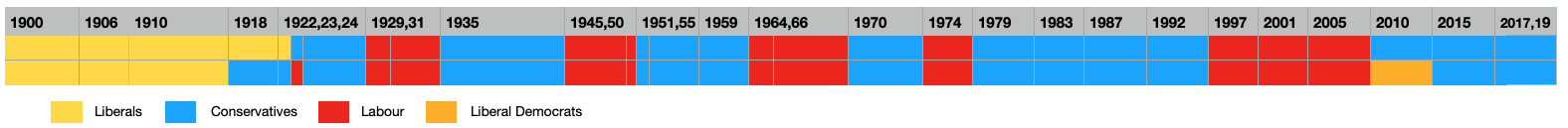
Parties forming governments 1900-present

== Devolved parliament and assembly elections ==
=== Scottish Parliament elections ===
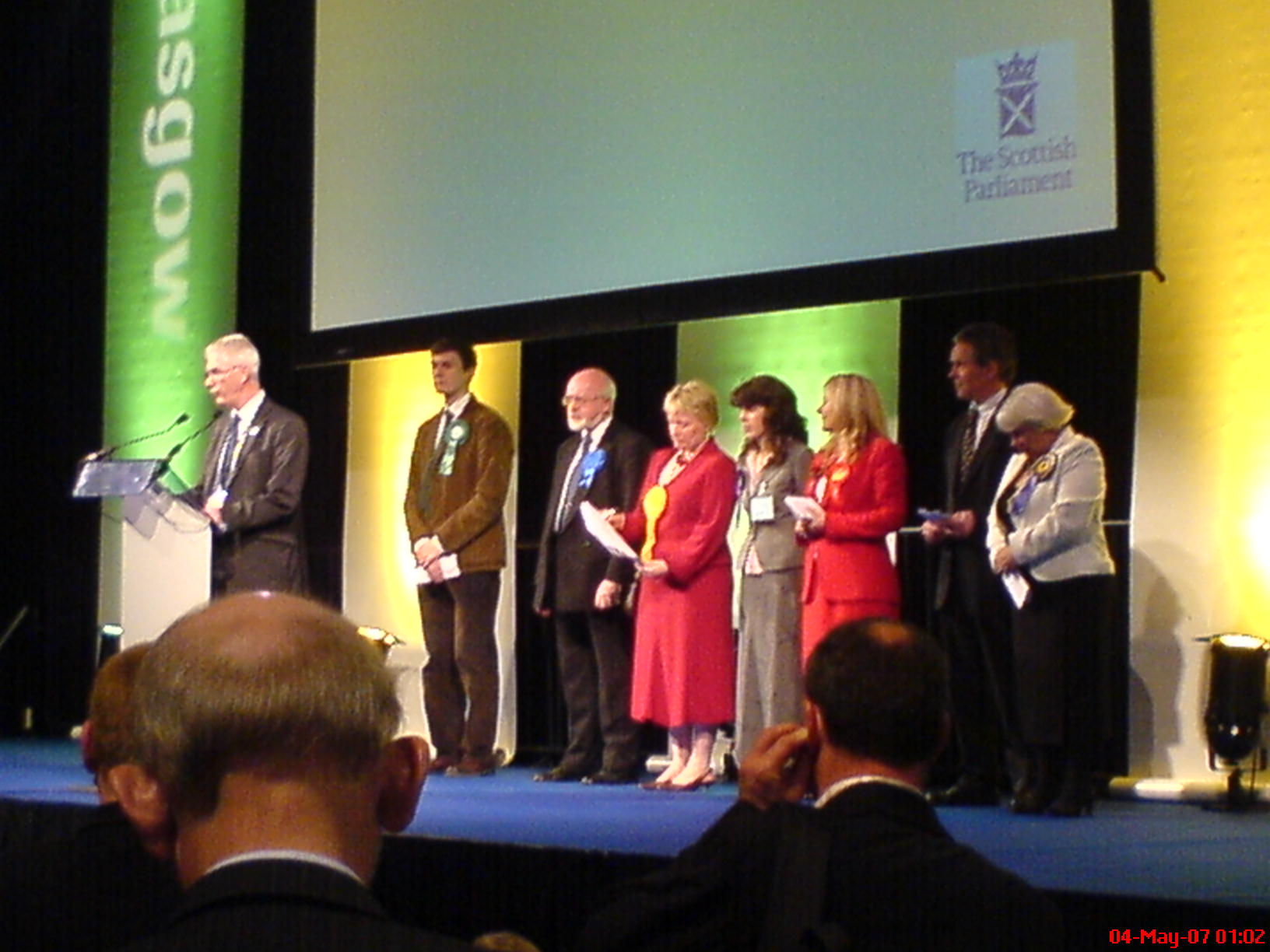
Declaration for the Kelvin Constituency in Glasgow at the 2007 Scottish Parliament election

Scottish Parliament elections for Members of the Scottish Parliament (MSPs) occurred every four years until 2020, when the parliament transitioned to a five-year election cycle. The first election to the unicameral Scottish Parliament that was created by the Scotland Act 1998, was held in 1999. Elections to the Scottish Parliament are by the Additional Member System, which is a hybrid of single member plurality and party list.

- 1999 Scottish Parliament election
- 2003 Scottish Parliament election
- 2007 Scottish Parliament election
- 2011 Scottish Parliament election
- 2016 Scottish Parliament election
- 2021 Scottish Parliament election
- 2026 Scottish Parliament election

=== Senedd elections ===
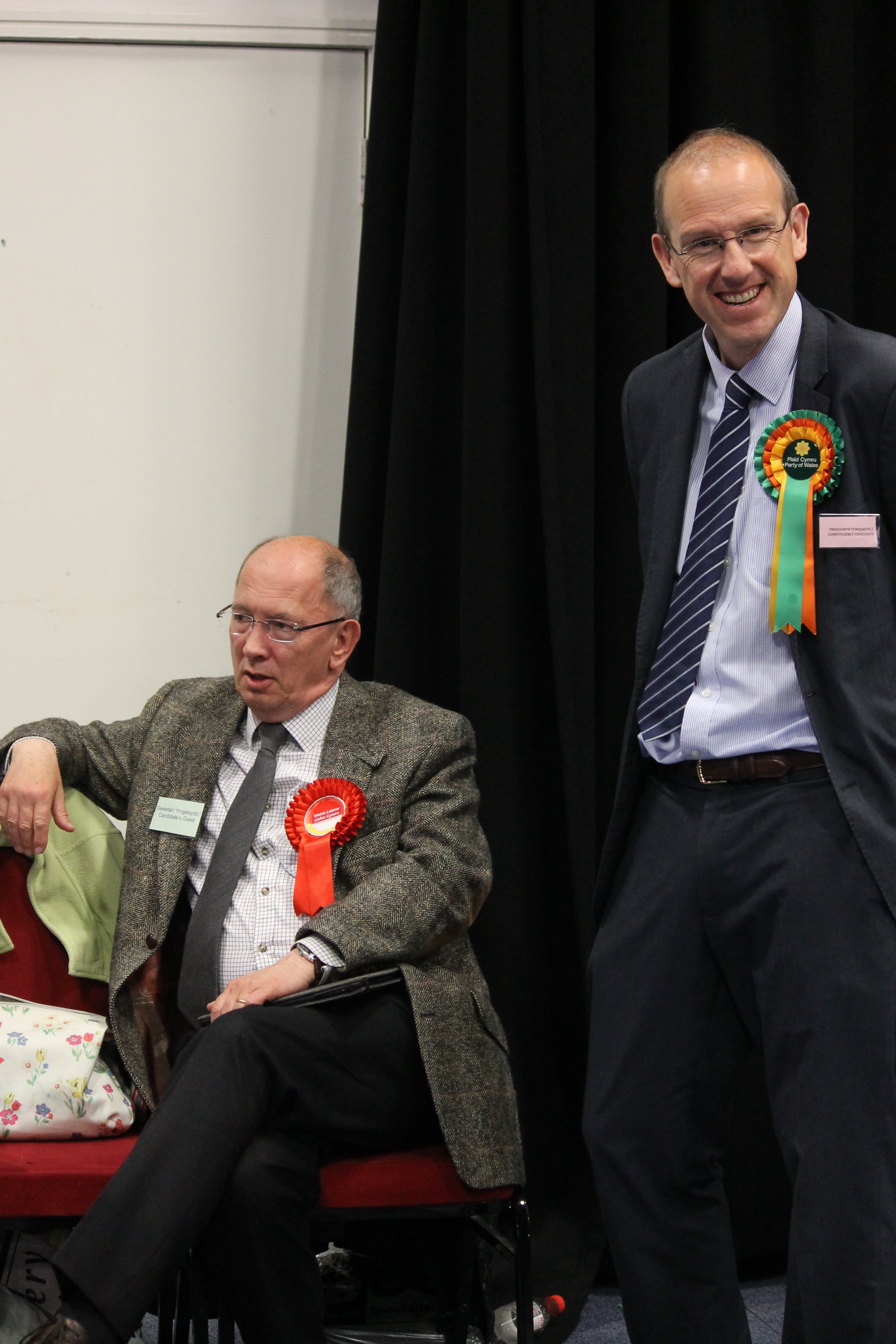
Candidates at the West Clwyd and Aberconwy count following the 2016 National Assembly for Wales election

Elections to the Senedd (Welsh Parliament, Welsh: Senedd Cymru, formerly National Assembly for Wales) are held on a four-year schedule since the 2026 Senedd election, following the passing of the Senedd Cymru Act 2024.

The first elections to the then National Assembly for Wales from 1999 were also every four years, however this was increased to five years from the 2016 election following the Wales Act 2014, as the originally planned 2015 election was rescheduled to 2016 to avoid a clash with the 2015 UK Parliament election. Five-year terms lasted until the 2026 election, when four-year terms were re-introduced. The assembly was renamed to the Welsh Parliament or Senedd Cymru (in Welsh), commonly referred to as just the "Senedd" in both languages, following the Senedd and Elections (Wales) Act 2020.

The elections elect Members of the Senedd (MSs; previously Assembly Members, ASs), under a form of party-list proportional representation since 2026, with six members being elected in each constituency. Before 2026, an Additional Member System, which is a hybrid of single member plurality and proportional representation was used, with 40 single-member constituencies and 20 MSs from five four-member regions.

The elections are:

- 1999 National Assembly for Wales election
- 2003 National Assembly for Wales election
- 2007 National Assembly for Wales election
- 2011 National Assembly for Wales election
- 2016 National Assembly for Wales election
- 2021 Senedd election
- 2026 Senedd election

=== Northern Ireland Assembly elections ===
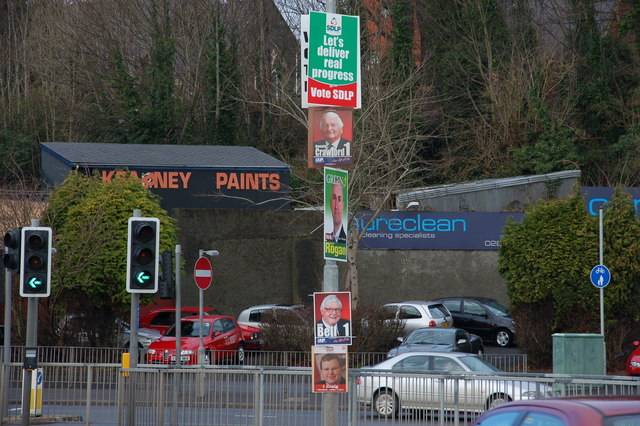
Posters for the 2007 Northern Ireland Assembly election in Lisburn

Northern Ireland Assembly elections occur every five (formerly four) years on the first Thursday in May. They began in 1998, when the assembly created by the Northern Ireland Act 1998 began its first session. For elections to the Northern Ireland Assembly, the Single Transferable Vote system, is used. Under this system, voters rank individual candidates in order of preference. STV was chosen as the electoral method to attempt to give adequate representation to the different sectarian groups in Northern Ireland. Elections continued even when the assembly was suspended between 2002 and 2007.

- 1998 Northern Ireland Assembly election
- 2003 Northern Ireland Assembly election
- 2007 Northern Ireland Assembly election
- 2011 Northern Ireland Assembly election
- 2016 Northern Ireland Assembly election
- 2017 Northern Ireland Assembly election
- 2022 Northern Ireland Assembly election

== Regional and local elections ==
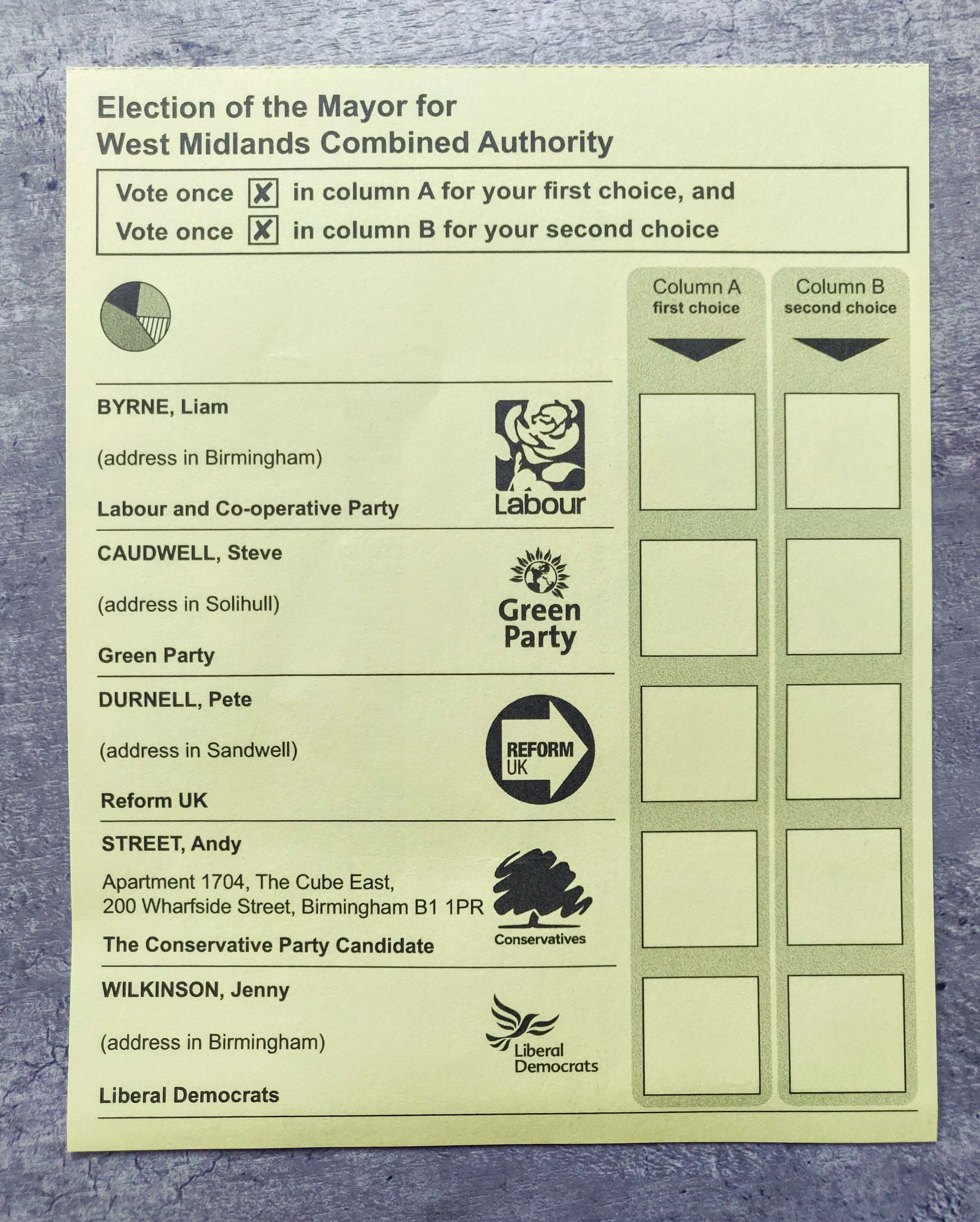
Ballot used at the 2021 West Midlands Mayoral election. The voter was allowed to choose a first and second preference option.

In local elections, councillors are elected to the local administrations throughout the United Kingdom. Local government and the local elections are devolved to the four countries of the UK. There are differing local government structures and election schedules between the four. Northern Ireland, Scotland and Wales, have one main tier of unitary councils, while Scotland and Wales also have lower community councils. In England, a number of tiers of local council exist, at region, county, district/borough and town/parish levels, and several regions directly elect mayors.

A variety of voting systems are used for local elections. In Northern Ireland and Scotland, the single transferable vote system is used, whilst in most of England and Wales the single member plurality system is used. The remainder of England (including all of the London Boroughs) and Wales use the plurality at-large system, except for the elections of the Mayor and Assembly of the Greater London Authority (GLA). Cumulative voting was used in England and Scotland in the late 19th century to elect some school boards.

Prior to the passage of the Elections Act 2022, mayoral elections used the supplementary vote (SV) system. The Act changed these to use first-past-the-post (FPTP) for future elections.

The only Region of England which has a directly elected administration is London. London Assembly elections began in 2000, when it was created. The additional-member system is used for elections to the Assembly.

Local elections are held in different parts of the country each year. In general, local elections are held on the first Thursday in May. In years with a general election it is usual practice to hold both general and local elections on the same day. In 2004, for the first time, local elections were held on the same day as European elections, and London Mayoral and Assembly elections. The date was referred to as 'Super Thursday'. This was repeated in 2021 where elections scheduled for 2020 were postponed to 2021, leading to English local elections, England and Wales crime commissioner elections, the Scottish Parliament election, the Senedd election, a UK parliament by-election, and mayoral elections (such as the London mayoral election or Greater Manchester mayoral election) were all held on 6 May 2021 and also dubbed as a 'Super Thursday'.

Unlike general elections, for local elections there is no legal requirement as to when the count should begin after the close of poll. For this reason, some returning officers have decided to store the sealed ballot boxes overnight at the central counting location and begin the count the next working day. However, once the count has started, the returning officer must, so far as practicable, proceed continuously with the count between the hours of 9am and 7pm (subject to refreshments). Ballot papers are verified manually and counted by hand (with the exception of London Mayoral and Assembly elections, where optical scanners are used).

== Police and crime commissioners ==
From 2012, England and Wales have voted for regional police and crime commissioners. Some regions elect police, fire and crime commissioners, who also have responsibility for fire services. Prior to the passage of the Elections Act 2022, these elections used the supplementary vote (SV) system. The Act changed these to use first-past-the-post (FPTP) for future elections.

London, Greater Manchester, and West Yorkshire do not elect police and crime commissioners, as such functions are the responsibility of their directly elected mayors.

== History ==
=== Before the creation of the United Kingdom ===
The first representative assembly was convened in what is now the United Kingdom in 1265. That year Simon de Montfort convened a Parliament that contained two knights from each shire (county) and two burgesses from each borough (city) — one of the earliest examples of representative parliaments in the world. For centuries all electoral districts held two or more seats. (The first single-member districts were used in the mid-sixteenth century after Wales was given representation.)

To elect these and later representatives, from 1265 in the Kingdom of England (into which Wales was incorporated from 1542), a small fraction of the adult male population were able to vote in parliamentary elections to the Parliament of England. These elections occurred at irregular intervals. From 1432 only forty-shilling freeholders held the parliamentary franchise. The franchise for the Parliament of Scotland developed separately but, again, involving just a small proportion of the adult population. The Bill of Rights 1689 in England and Claim of Right Act 1689 in Scotland established the principles of regular parliaments and free elections, but no significant changes to the electoral franchise took place until long after the United Kingdom came into being in 1707.

Similarly, the history of local government in England stretches over the same period with the election of town mayors and the development of town councils taking place since the Middle Ages. Local government in Scotland and in Wales evolved separately.

Voters could cast as many votes as the number of seats in the district in the early years, and these votes were given orally (secret voting not being adopted until 1872).

=== Expansion of the franchise and other reforms ===
==== 19th century ====
Although the institutions implemented after the Glorious Revolution were successful in restraining the government and ensuring protection for property rights, the first Act to extend the right to vote was the Reform Act 1832 (sometimes known as the Great Reform Act). It lowered the property qualification to vote in boroughs. An electoral register was created. It abolished 56 of the rotten boroughs (which had elected 112 MPs) and took the second seat away from another 30 of the smallest boroughs. It gave some parliamentary representation to the new industrial towns by giving them 142 seats. The overall result of the Act was that the electorate was increased to 14% of the adult male population.

Between 1838 and 1848 a popular movement, Chartism, organised around six demands including universal male franchise and the secret ballot. The Reform Act 1867 redistributed MPs from boroughs that had disproportionally-large representation to London and previously under-represented industrial towns. It lowered the property qualification in boroughs, so that all men with an address in boroughs could vote. For the first time some of the working class could vote, and MPs and candidates began to take these new voters into account at least to some extent. Some political parties became national entities. Overall, the Act increased the electorate to 32% of the adult male population. As well, 14 district electing more than two members were switched from plurality block voting to limited voting, which they used until 1885. Birmingham and 12 other districts elected 3, and each voter cast up to two votes. The City of London riding elected four and each voter cast up to three votes. This mostly prevented a clean sweep of district seats by one party (although on two occasions a one-party sweep happened).

The Ballot Act 1872 replaced open elections with a secret ballot system. The Corrupt and Illegal Practices Prevention Act 1883 criminalised attempts to bribe voters and standardised the amount that could be spent on election expenses. The Representation of the People Act 1884 (the Third Reform Act) and the Redistribution of Seats Act 1885 together increased the electorate to 56% of the adult male population. Changes made under the latter Act reduced the number of MPs elected in two-seat districts to 56.

From the birth of the United Kingdom, the franchise had been restricted to males by custom rather than statute; on rare occasions women had been able to vote in parliamentary elections as a result of property ownership until the 1832 Great Reform Act, and the Municipal Corporations Act 1835 for local government elections, specified voters as "male persons". In local elections, unmarried women ratepayers received the right to vote in the Municipal Franchise Act 1869. This right was confirmed in the Local Government Act 1894 and extended to include some married women. By 1900, more than 1 million women were registered to vote in local government elections in England.

==== 20th century ====
The Representation of the People Act 1918 expanded the electorate to include all men over the age of 21 and most women over the age of 30. Later that year, the Parliament (Qualification of Women) Act 1918 gave women over 21 the right to stand for election as MPs. The first woman to become an MP was Constance Markievicz in 1918. However she declined to take up her seat, being a member of Sinn Féin. Nancy Astor, elected in 1919, was the second woman to become an MP, and the first to sit in the Commons. The Equal Franchise Act 1928 lowered the minimum age for women to vote from 30 to 21, making men and women equal in terms of suffrage for the first time. The Representation of the People Act 1949 abolished additional votes for graduates in university constituencies and for the owners of business premises. However, as late as in 1968, only ratepayers were allowed to vote in local elections in Northern Ireland, leading to disenfranchisement and misrepresentation of the communities in the council and to the events that created Free Derry. As well, in 1918 single transferable voting (STV) was adopted for the university constituencies of Cambridge, Oxford, and others. These constituencies used STV until the abolition of the districts in 1950 (until 1922 in the case of Dublin University).

The Representation of the People Act 1969 lowered the voting age from 21 to 18, the first major country to do so. The Representation of the People Act 1985 gave British citizens abroad the right to vote for a five-year period after they had left the United Kingdom. The Representation of the People Act 1989 extended the period to 20 years; and citizens who were too young to vote when they left the country also became eligible.

==== Summary ====
The following table summarises historic developments in extending the franchise in England and later the UK (after 1707). At each stage, it shows the proportion of the adult population entitled to vote and the voting age, separately for males and females.

Year	Adult male		Adult female		Act of parliament	Notes
Year	Entitlement (%)	Voting age	Entitlement (%)	Voting age	Act of parliament	Notes
1265 to 1689	<10		Negligible			Periodic elected parliaments; after 1432 only forty-shilling freeholders were enfranchised.
1689 to 1832	<10		Negligible		Bill of Rights 1689	Established the principles of regular parliaments and free elections.
1832	14	21	0	—N/a	Reform Act 1832	Great Reform Act standardised the franchise for all boroughs for the first time.
1867	32	21	0	—N/a	Reform Act 1867	Second Reform Act enfranchised householders - working classes gained the vote.
1885	56	21	0	—N/a	Reform Act 1884 and Redistribution of Seats Act 1885	Third Reform Act extended the 1867 concessions from boroughs to county constituencies.
1918	100	21	67	30	Representation of the People Act 1918	Fourth Reform Act abolished most property qualifications for men; enfranchised most women.
1928	100	21	100	21	Representation of the People Act 1928	Equal Suffrage Act abolished age disparity and property qualifications for women; resulted in universal suffrage.
1948	100	21	100	21	Representation of the People Act 1948	Removed double vote entitlements regarding business premises and university constituencies.
1969	100	18	100	18	Representation of the People Act 1969	Extended suffrage to include 18- to 20-year-olds.

=== Labour (1997–2010) electoral reforms ===
Prior to 1997 and the Labour Party government of Tony Blair, only three main types of government elections occurred in the United Kingdom: elections to the House of Commons, local government elections, and elections to the European Parliament. Most elections used the First Past the Post (FPTP) electoral system. In Northern Ireland, both local government and European elections were conducted using the Single Transferable Vote (STV) system.

Labour's constitutional reforms introduced elected assemblies for London, Scotland and Wales, and directly elected executive mayors in certain English cities. Proportional Representation (PR) was introduced outside Northern Ireland for the first time since it use in the Sligo (Ireland)'s 1917 city election and the 1920 Irish local elections, at the time in the UK, and to fill university Parliamentary seats, which ended in 1950.

The hybrid (part PR, part FPTP) Additional Member System was introduced in 1999 for the newly created devolved parliament and assemblies: the Scottish Parliament, Welsh Assembly and London Assembly and STV was used for the newly created Northern Ireland Assembly. The regional party list (Closed list) system was introduced for European elections in Great Britain (which had previously used single member constituency FPTP) though Northern Ireland continues to use STV.

Labour passed the Political Parties, Elections and Referendums Act 2000, which created the Electoral Commission, which since 2000 has been responsible for the running of elections and referendums and to a limited extent regulating party funding. It also reduced the period during which British expatriates can vote, from 20 years after they emigrate to 15.

In 2006 the age of candidacy for public elections in the UK was reduced from 21 to 18 with the passing of the Electoral Administration Act 2006.

In 2008 the Ministry of Justice delivered a report that failed to conclusively recommend any particular voting system as "best" and instead simply compared working practices used in the different elections. The Minister of State for Justice, Ministry of Justice (Michael Wills) issued a statement following its publication stating that no action would be taken on the various reports that, since 1997, have suggested a move towards proportional representation for the UK general election until reform of the House of Lords is completed.

Labour also made multiple changes to the election administration underpinning the way that elections are run. Changes included postal voting on demand, rolling registration and some innovative pilots such as internet voting.

=== European Parliament elections (1979–2019) ===
As a former member state of the European Union and its predecessor the European Communities between 1973 and 2020, the United Kingdom elected Members of the European Parliament (MEP's) from 1979 until 2020 with elections being held once every five years. These were the only national elections other than general elections that were held across the United Kingdom. MEP elections differed from general elections in two major ways, the first being that EU citizens from outside Ireland, Malta and Cyprus were eligible to vote and the second that it used forms of proportional representation as the main electoral voting systems.

Elections to the European Parliament took place from 1979, the first year in which the parliament was directly elected. From 1973 to 1979, members were elected by national parliaments.

From the 1999 election, Members of the European Parliament were elected by a closed-list party list system method of proportional representation, calculated using the D'Hondt method in Great Britain (England, Scotland and Wales). In Northern Ireland the Single Transferable Vote system was used from 1979 onwards.

The use of proportional representation has significantly increased the representation of minor parties. Until the 1999 election, the First Past the Post system was used, which had prevented parties with moderately large, but geographically spread out vote shares from receiving any seats. For example, in the 1989 election the Green Party received 2,292,718 votes, constituting a 15% vote share, but no seats. The European Parliamentary Elections Act 1999 changed the system in time for the 1999 election.

From 1979 to 1989, the United Kingdom had 81 MEPs (78 in England, Wales and Scotland, 3 in Northern Ireland). The European Parliamentary Elections Act 1993 increased the number to 87, adding five more seats in England and one more in Wales. The number was reduced to 78 for the 2004 election, and to 72 for the 2009 election, but increased to 73 during the term of the 2009–2014 parliament. The UK's representation in Europe remained at this level for both the 2014 and 2019 elections.

On 31 January 2020 the United Kingdom left the European Union after 47 years of membership and under the provisions of the European Union (Withdrawal) Act 2018 all legislation for the provision of the holding of European elections and the position of Member of the European Parliament was repealed.

Year	Date	Members	Constituencies
1979 European Parliament election	7 June 1979	81	79
1984 European Parliament election	14 June 1984	81	79
1989 European Parliament election	15 June 1989	81	79
1994 European Parliament election	9 June 1994	87	85
1999 European Parliament election	10 June 1999	87	12
2004 European Parliament election	10 June 2004	78	12
2009 European Parliament election	4 June 2009	72	12
2014 European Parliament election	22 May 2014	73	12
2019 European Parliament election	23 May 2019	73	12

==== Former distribution of UK seats to European Parliament ====
The former European Parliament constituency areas in the United Kingdom (2004–2020).

The United Kingdom was divided into twelve electoral regions, which were the three smaller nations (Scotland, Wales and Northern Ireland), and the nine regions of England with the 73 UK seats being divided up between these regions. The number of seats that each region is allocated was determined by the Electoral Commission based on population. The last revision of the seat allocation for the regions took place in 2011 when the West Midlands gained an extra seat.

The following contains the regional distribution of the seats as it was for the 2019 election.

Electoral region	Number of seats
East Midlands	5
East of England	7
London	8
North East England	3
North West England	8
South East England	10
South West England^{1}	6
West Midlands	7
Yorkshire and the Humber	6
Wales	4
Scotland	6
Northern Ireland	3

^{1} Includes Gibraltar, the only British overseas territory which was part of the European Union.

=== Reforms post-devolution in Scotland ===
Using powers granted by devolution, the Scottish Parliament has on two occasions broadened the franchise for elections under its control, namely Scottish Parliament elections and Scottish local authority elections.

Using powers granted by the Scotland Act 2012, in 2015 the Scottish Parliament unanimously passed a bill to lower the minimum voting age from 18 to 16. Prior to that, the Scottish Independence Referendum Act 2013 had likewise allowed 16- and 17-year-olds to vote in the Scottish independence referendum, 2014.

Using powers granted by the Scotland Act 2016, in 2020 the Scottish Parliament passed by a greater than two-thirds majority (required under the Act) a bill to extend the right to vote to all foreign nationals with leave to remain (limited or indefinite), and to allow those with indefinite leave to remain or pre-settled status to stand as candidates.

=== Reforms post-devolution in Wales ===
The voting age in Wales for elections to the Senedd (Wales' devolved Parliament, also called the Welsh Parliament in English) was lowered from 18-years-old to 16-years-old with the passing of the Senedd and Elections (Wales) Act 2020 in November 2019, before receiving Royal Assent on 15 January 2020, making it official law. The Local Government and Elections (Wales) Bill passed its final stage in the Senedd in November 2020 and was given Royal Assent on 20 January 2021, lowering the voting age from 18 to 16 years old for local elections in Wales. Police and Crime Commissioner (PCC) elections are a reserved matter, meaning it is not within the Senedd/Welsh Parliament's power to lower the voting age for these elections but held by Parliament of the United Kingdom, of which the voting age remains 18. In summary, only PCC and UK Parliament elections in Wales retain a voting age of 18, while local elections in Wales and Senadd elections both have a voting age of 16.

== Current issues ==
The main political issues in the United Kingdom were immigration, economy, health care and inflation according to a 2026 Ipsos poll.

=== Electoral reform ===
==== Proportional representation ====
Some groups have agitated for proportional representation for many years, but as of 2026 this has not been successful.

=== Candidate safety and harassment ===
In September 2026, the Electoral Commission reported that 55 per cent of candidates in the 2026 local elections in England had faced intimidation or abuse during their campaigns — up from 47 per cent the previous year. Online harassment emerged as the most common form of abuse, with 39 per cent of candidates saying they had received unacceptable messages on social media. The report also documented street stalking, verbal attacks, and physical violence. Only 15 per cent of those targeted chose to report the incidents to the police. Abuse levels differed by party: more than half of Labour and Reform UK candidates reported mistreatment, compared with 43 per cent for the Green Party, 26 per cent for the Conservatives, and 22 per cent for the Liberal Democrats. The Electoral Commission warned that rising hostility risked putting people off seeking public office and urged social media platforms to remove offensive content more quickly. Vijay Rangarajan, the commission's chief executive, said the levels of hostility "demonstrate the growing threats posed to democracy," while Conservative deputy leader Alex Burghart said candidates "must be free to campaign... without fear of abuse or intimidation."

=== Low turnout ===
As in multiple Western democracies, voter apathy is a current concern, after a dramatic decline in election turnout around the end of the 20th century. Turnout in UK general elections fell from 77% in 1992, and 71% in 1997, to a historic low of 59% in 2001. It has, however, increased, to 61% in 2005, 65% in 2010, 66% in 2015 and 69% in 2017. Turnout has fallen since, to 67% in 2019 and to 59% in 2024.

In other elections, turnout trends have been more varied. At the referendum on Scottish independence in 2014, turnout exceeded 84.5% – the highest in a large-scale poll since the introduction of universal suffrage – and some local authorities recorded turnouts of over 90%. Conversely, the Police and Crime Commissioner elections in November 2012 saw a record low turnout of just 15%, and the Parliamentary by-election in Manchester Central also had a record low peacetime by-election turnout of 18%. Parliamentary by-election turnout is usually around 30-50%, while local government elections typically see turnouts of around 30% when they are not held alongside higher profile contests such as general elections.

== See also ==
- British Polling Council
- Censorship in the United Kingdom
- Electoral register
- Electoral calendar
- Election Day (United Kingdom)
- Electoral system
- Election agent
  - Polling agent
  - Counting agent
- List of United Kingdom general elections (for election results)
- United Kingdom national and local elections
- List of UK by-elections (for by-election results)
- List of UK parliamentary election petitions
- Referendums in the United Kingdom
- Political campaigning on election practicalities.
- Historical anomalies of the British electoral system
  - University constituency
  - Rotten borough
- Electoral Administration Act 2006
- Electoral Reform Society
- Electoral Commission
- UK Parliament Week
- United Kingdom Election Results
- Women's suffrage in the United Kingdom
