= Anonymous elector =

Voter whose details are not publicly available

An anonymous elector is generally a registered voter whose safety would be at risk if their details were available on a public electoral register.

== Australia ==
In Australia, a voter anonymously registered is known as a silent elector. To be a silent elector, a voter must satisfy the Divisional Returning Officer that their safety or that of any other person living in the same household would be at risk if their name and address were printed in the electoral register. Application for silent status occurs through an online form on the Australian Electoral Commission website or by uploading a scanned paper form.

Silent electors may register as a general postal voter so that their ballot papers are automatically mailed to them when an election or referendum is called. Otherwise, silent electors are able to vote via the same options as the rest of the population, either by attending a polling place on polling day or a pre-poll in the lead up to an election, or applying for a one-off postal vote.

== New Zealand ==
An eligible elector who believes that having their details entered on the publicly viewable electoral roll could threaten their personal safety or that of their family can apply for their details be included only on the unpublished roll. The application must be accompanied by evidence, such as a copy of a protection order that is in force under the Domestic Violence Act 1995, a copy of a restraining order that is in force under the Harassment Act 1997, a statutory declaration from a member of the New Zealand Police, or a letter from either a barrister or solicitor, the employer, a justice of the peace, or the like, supporting the application on the grounds that the applicant's personal safety, or that of their family, could be prejudiced by the publication of their name and details. An elector remains on the unpublished roll until such time as their circumstances change.

As unpublished rolls are not made available at polling booths, voters on the unpublished roll must cast a special vote.

== United Kingdom ==
A person who qualifies to register to vote can be registered anonymously if they can satisfy the electoral registration officer that their safety or that of any other person living in the same household would be at risk if their name and address were printed in the electoral register.

A voter can apply to be an anonymous elector at any time by using registration forms available from local electoral registration officers or the Electoral Commission's website. The applicant must state a reason why they or someone else in the same household would be at risk should their name and address be publicly available in the electoral register. In addition, the application must be supported either by a court order or an attestation. Attestations can be made by a police officer of or above the rank of superintendent of any UK police force, the Director General of the Security Service or the National Crime Agency, a director of adult social services or children's services in England, a director of social services in Wales, any chief social work officer in Scotland or any director of social services of a Health and Social Services Board or executive director of social work of a Health and Social Services Trust in Northern Ireland. Application forms can be returned to the local electoral registration officer by post, by fax or by e-mail as a scanned attachment.

Once the anonymous elector application has been accepted by the electoral registration officer, the applicant's entry in the Electoral Register appears as an elector number and the letter N, rather than their name and address. Only the returning officer, the jury service in England and Wales, the security services and police forces have access to the name and address of anonymous electors. A "certificate of anonymous registration" is then issued to the anonymous elector in case they need to prove their identity and address in order to obtain credit or to donate money or loan money to a political party/candidate (but as this involves handing over name and address details to a third party, the anonymous elector should only do this if they are absolutely confident that the other party will keep the information secure). The anonymous elector registration lasts twelve months, after which it must be renewed.

To vote in person, an anonymous elector must take their poll card, which would not be required by a non-anonymous elector.

== United States ==
In the United States of America, a state-run Address Confidentiality Program allows victims of crime including domestic violence, stalking, and other crimes to keep their address confidential. This includes creating a false address, and applies to different government departments depending on the state. All states except Arkansas apply their Confidential Address Programs to voter registration.
