= The History of British Political Parties =

2001 book by David Boothroyd

- Book cover
- Author: David Boothroyd
- Language: English
- Subject: British political parties
- Genre: Reference
- Publisher: Politico's Publishing Ltd
- Publication date: 2001
- Publication place: United Kingdom
- Pages: 320
- ISBN: 1-902301-59-5
- OCLC: 45327831
- Preceded by: United Kingdom Election Results (1994)

The History of British Political Parties, also referred to as Politico's Guide to the History of British Political Parties, is a reference book about political parties in the United Kingdom. Written by David Boothroyd, it was published in 2001 by Politico's Publishing Ltd and distributed in the United States by International Specialized Book Services (ISBS). At the time of the book's publication, Boothroyd worked as a researcher with Parliamentary Monitoring Services. The book contains entries on over 250 UK political parties that have participated in parliamentary elections. It is structured alphabetically by entry, with the size of each entry relative to the history and influence of the individual political party. Boothroyd includes information about the history and election statistics of each party, as well as a brief narrative. He focuses on the Conservative, Liberal, and Labour parties; the parties with the most significant histories in British politics.

Boothroyd's work received positive reviews in book journals. The book was recommended by The School Librarian and Choice: Current Reviews for Academic Libraries, although the latter criticised it for not including bibliographical aids. The authors of the bibliographical work Information Sources of Political Science described it as a "handy guide", and it was used as a reference in Third Force Politics: Liberal Democrats at the Grassroots.

== Contents ==
The History of British Political Parties is a comprehensive work which lists and describes over 250 political parties in the United Kingdom that have participated in parliamentary elections since 1832. Entries are organised alphabetically, and most descriptions of the political parties span a few paragraphs or pages. Space is allotted to each entry based on the individual party's history and influence; 34 pages are devoted to the Conservative Party, whereas only two paragraphs are given to the Captain Beany's New Millennium Bean Party.

Each entry contains objective information on the party including its history, address, the number of registered members, election statistics, and their email address and website if these exist. The author provides a detailed, narrative description of each party. Boothroyd writes, "Only three parties out of the 250 ... have ever formed a government in the United Kingdom." He devotes the most discussion in the book to the Conservative, Liberal and Labour parties. The book includes cross-references to enable the reader to easily locate political parties that have had changes over time.

== Reception ==
In a review of the book for The School Librarian, Valerie Caless wrote, "Overall, this is a thorough historical guide to the political parties, and will serve as a very useful reference book for students of both history and politics at all levels. A glossary or 'concepts' guide would have been a bonus for the new or less patient student." N.W. Polsby of the University of California, Berkeley reviewed the book for Choice: Current Reviews for Academic Libraries, and wrote, "The total absence of bibliographical aids is a weakness of this book. Its strengths are its plainly factual and accessible writing. This is a book to be consulted, not read straight through. Recommended at all levels." A review in Reference & Research Book News said, "The book is intended as an affordable reference book for the general reader interested in British politics". The History of British Political Parties was also reviewed in Parliamentary Affairs.

In the 2003 book The Times House of Commons Guide: 1929, 1931, 1935, Boothroyd is mentioned as the author of The History of British Political Parties and referred to as "an elections specialist". In the 2005 bibliographical work Information Sources of Political Science, authors Stephen W. Green, Douglas Ernest, and Frederick L. Holler described Boothroyd's book as "a handy guide to approximately 250 British political parties," and wrote, "Even some of the more humorous and tongue-in-cheek political parties are included in this handbook, such as the Official Monster Raving Loony Party".

The book is used as a reference in the works Third Force Politics: Liberal Democrats at the Grassroots (2006) by Paul Whiteley, Patrick Seyd and Antony Billinghurst, published by Oxford University Press; The Logic of Pre-Electoral Coalition Formation (2006) by Sona Nadenichek Golder, published by Ohio State University Press; and in Posters, Propaganda, and Persuasion in Election Campaigns Around the World and Through History (2008) by Steven A. Seidman. Nicholas Whyte of the website Northern Ireland Access Research Knowledge (ARK) wrote, "For general information about political parties in Northern Ireland since 1922, the whole of Ireland 1801–1922, England, Scotland, and Wales, I urge you to get hold of Politico's Guide to the History of British Political Parties by David Boothroyd available from Politico's."

== See also ==
- Elections in the United Kingdom
- List of UK by-elections
- List of political parties in the United Kingdom
- Politics of the United Kingdom
- United Kingdom general elections
