= Electoral registration =

Electoral registration may refer to:

- Voter registration
- Electoral roll
- Electoral registration in the United Kingdom
- Electoral registration officer
