= Northern Ireland Electoral Identity Card =

Identity card used to identify voters in Northern Ireland

The Northern Ireland Electoral Identity Card is a photographic identity card issued by the Electoral Office for Northern Ireland, used primarily to prove the holder's identity when voting at a polling station in Northern Ireland.

The card's primary purpose is for proving identity and age at polling stations, but is also accepted by banks for proof of identity. In addition, most clubs, pubs, and retailers that sell alcohol accept the card as valid proof of age across Northern Ireland.

The UK Government confirmed the Northern Ireland Electoral Identity Card will also be accepted in mainland UK when mandatory ID for voting comes into effect.

== See also ==
- Elections in Northern Ireland
