= Graham Shields =

Public servant and former police officer in Northern Ireland

Graham Shields OBE

Chief Electoral Officer for Northern Ireland
- In office 11 October 2010 – 31 January 2017

Graham Shields OBE was the Chief Electoral Officer for Northern Ireland from 11 October 2010 to 31 January 2017, having previously been Assistant Chief Electoral Officer. He had previously served as a police officer, reaching the senior rank of Chief Superintendent.

Shields was appointed Officer of the Order of the British Empire (OBE) in the 2017 Birthday Honours for services to electoral democracy.

He is a member of Northern Ireland's Human Rights Commission.
