= Parliamentary Monitoring Services =

United Kingdom-based political research and publishing company

- Founded: 1979
- Headquarters: London, United Kingdom
- Key people: Lionel Zetter (managing director)
- Services: Political research
- Owner: Huveaux

Parliamentary Monitoring Services is a United Kingdom-based political research and publishing company. The company researches the activities of the United States Congress, European Parliament, and the Parliament of the United Kingdom. Consultants to the company have included British politicians Sir Peter Fry and William Howie, Baron Howie of Troon. The company published PMS Guide to Pressure Groups and PMS Guide to the 1997 General Election.

The company has been hired to undertake political research work by The Sunday Times and The Royal British Legion. In 2006, the company and its sister company Political Wizard were sold to Dods Parliamentary Communications, a subsidiary of Dods (Group) PLC—formerly Huveaux PLC. Colin Doeg, author of Crisis Management in the Food and Drinks Industry, characterized the company as a "comprehensive service". The Independent described it as a "well-known political lobbying firm".

== Political research ==
=== 1979–2002 ===
Parliamentary Monitoring Services was founded in London in 1979. The company researches the activities of the United States Congress, European Parliament, and the Parliament of the United Kingdom. Lionel Zetter became Managing Director of the company in 1986. In 1992 the company conducted a study commissioned by The Sunday Times which "revealed that, for the first time, more Conservatives were educated in state schools than in private schools". In 1995, Sir Peter Fry was a paid consultant and shareholder of Parliamentary Monitoring Services. The company published the second edition of PMS Guide to Pressure Groups in 1997, and the third edition by J. Flower in 2000. David Boothroyd, author of The History of British Political Parties, was a researcher at the company in 2001. Boothroyd was the principal compiler of the second edition of PMS Guide to Pressure Groups and PMS Guide to the 1997 General Election. In 2002, the company was hired by The Royal British Legion to develop an Internet-based tool to help the organization make its case for Her Majesty's Government to recognize Gulf War syndrome.

=== 2002 – present ===
William Howie, Baron Howie of Troon served as a publishing consultant to Parliamentary Monitoring Services in 2004; in 2007 The Times reported that Lord Howie received "regular remunerated employment" from the company. In 2005, Zetter was Managing Director of the company's sister firm, Political Wizard. In Public Affairs in Practice, Zetter wrote, "Without parliamentary monitoring, political news and political intelligence no public affairs campaign can hope to succeed". Westminster lobbyist Doug Smith served as chairman of the company in 2006; by 2007, Smith had left this role and his position on the company's board of directors. In 2006, Parliamentary Monitoring Services owned half of Political Wizard and received £1.5 million for this share when Political Wizard was bought by Huveaux subsidiary Dods Parliamentary Communications. Zetter decided in 2006 to sell Parliamentary Monitoring Services to Dods Parliamentary Communications, and its parent Huveaux purchased the company for £4.8 million. In 2007, Huveaux owned Parliamentary Monitoring Services through the Dods brand, the parent company's political division.

== Commentary ==
When asked if the Department for Work and Pensions maintained profiles on Members of Parliament (MPs), Secretary of State for Work and Pensions Andrew Smith said, "The Department does not compile personal profiles on MPs. We do have access to parliamentary reference works such as Dods and in order to provide, in a cost-effective way, such reference information to the large number of officials drafting parliamentary answers we subscribe to Parliamentary Monitoring Services Ltd. (PMS)." Writing in the book Crisis Management in the Food and Drinks Industry, Colin Doeg characterized Parliamentary Monitoring Services as a "Comprehensive service covering the proceedings of Westminster and European Parliaments as well as US Congress". The organization is described in Public Relations in Practice as "a political research, publishing, polling and campaigning company". James Macintyre and Nigel Morris of The Independent called Parliamentary Monitoring Services a "well-known political lobbying firm".

== See also ==
- List of political parties in the United Kingdom
- Politics of the United Kingdom
- Pressure groups in the United Kingdom
- Referendums in the United Kingdom
