= United Kingdom Election Results =

Website and e-book by David Boothroyd

- Screenshot of first page
- Author: David Boothroyd
- Language: English
- Subject: Elections in the United Kingdom
- Genre: Non-fiction
- Publisher: D. Boothroyd
- Publication date: 1994
- Publication place: United Kingdom
- OCLC: 51544846
- Followed by: The History of British Political Parties (2001)

United Kingdom Election Results is an e-book and former website written by David Boothroyd, first published in 1994. Boothroyd also wrote The History of British Political Parties, published in 2001. The website includes material about elections in the United Kingdom, including election results, resources for further information and links to relevant websites. Boothroyd used a minimalist approach for the site's design, avoiding "flashy graphics" and placing an emphasis on "authoritative unbiased information".

Boothroyd's website has been cited by several organisations and authors, including the United Nations Development Programme and the Parliament of Australia. Boothroyd's site is listed as a resource by the website of the Parliamentary Library of the Parliament of Australia, and the Gilbert + Tobin Centre of Public Law at The University of New South Wales. The Data & Information Services Center of the University of Wisconsin said that Boothroyd maintains "an emphasis on including the entire range of parties", and The University of York library said that the "site maintained by David Boothroyd provides detailed results data for all UK Parliamentary Elections since 1983".

== Contents ==
The site contained information and resources related to UK elections, including election results, lists of candidates and maps of election districts. It also contained resources such as links to relevant websites covering politics and those of political parties. In an introduction to the website, Boothroyd wrote: "Unlike some other political sites, this site doesn't go in for minimising the information to 'major parties' only, using flashy graphics that distract from the content, compromising its impartiality by accepting sponsorship, or including irrelevant party propaganda. On these pages you will find authoritative unbiased information and nothing else."

Data on parliamentary elections in the UK since 1983 were on the website. It also included results of the Labour Party National Executive Committee elections, European Parliamentary elections from 1994 onwards, a list of members expelled since the 1660 Restoration, and recent regional elections for the National Assembly for Wales, the Northern Ireland Assembly, and the Greater London Authority. The earliest snapshot of the website in the archival database Internet Archive is from 1996. The website was located at www.election.demon.co.uk. As of 2025, it is offline.

== Reception ==
"David Boothroyd maintains this site of British Parliamentary Election results, going back in some cases as far as 1983, with an emphasis on including the entire range of parties."

— University of Wisconsin

Several authors and organisations—including United Nations Development Programme (2004), the Politics and Public Administration Group of the Parliament of Australia (2002), and Scott L. Greer (2005)—have cited Boothroyd's website in their works. Oonag Gay and Patricia Leopold used information about parliamentary expulsion from the site in their book Conduct Unbecoming:The Regulation of Parliamentary Behaviour (2004); they wrote, "As the author, David Boothroyd, makes clear, expulsion was no bar to further parliamentary career in the eighteenth century." The Guardian referenced the site in a 2007 article about politics of education in the UK.

In their 2008 book The Politics of Electoral Systems, Michael Gallagher and Paul Mitchell wrote that Boothroyd's site "Has detailed results of elections at all levels of government." The website of the Parliamentary Library of the Parliament of Australia lists Boothroyd's site as a resource, as does the Gilbert + Tobin Centre of Public Law at The University of New South Wales. The Data & Information Services Center of the University of Wisconsin said that Boothroyd maintains "an emphasis on including the entire range of parties". RBA (Rhodes-Blakeman Associates) website maintained by Karen Blakeman describes Boothroyd's resource as a "fast-loading, no-nonsense site". The University of York library said that the "site maintained by David Boothroyd provides detailed results data for all UK Parliamentary Elections since 1983". "Scottish Politics", the website of the Scottish Politics Research Institute, Alba Publishing said, "Those interested in election results and analysis from England & Wales are encouraged to consult David Boothroyd's inspirational United Kingdom Election Results site."

== See also ==
- Elections in the United Kingdom
- List of UK by-elections
- List of political parties in the United Kingdom
- Politics of the United Kingdom
- United Kingdom general elections
