= Tactile voting device =

A tactile voting device is a device to enable a visually impaired person to mark a ballot paper in secret.

The plastic device is attached to a ballot paper, and consists of a number of flaps, each covering one of the boxes on the paper. A number, corresponding to the box covered, is embossed in black on each flap. The number shows up well against the white background of the ballot paper, and is raised so it can be identified by touch.

Once the voter knows which number corresponds to each candidate or option, they lift the relevant flap or flaps, so they know where to make their mark.

In Northern Ireland, all polling stations have a tactile voting device available.
