= Electoral registration officer =

In the United Kingdom, an Electoral Registration Officer (ERO) is a person is in charge of electoral registration for a designated area and who has the statutory duty to compile, maintain, and publish the electoral register. In England, Scotland and Wales, this includes conducting the annual canvass. The position should not be confused with that of Returning Officer, charged with overseeing the actual elections.

== Duties ==
The Electoral Registration Officer (ERO) is charged with maintaining a register of parliamentary electors, and a register of local government electors. The registers should be combined as far as practicable, and contain information such as names, addresses and conditions affecting the franchise of the registered persons. They serve as the data controller in regards to Data Protection laws, but simultaneously must publish and edited, or open, version of the register, containing names and addresses of those on the full register and consultable by the public.

As the electoral registers must be as accurate and complete as possible, the Electoral Registration Officers have a duty to ensure that all those eligible – and none others – are registered, and that the registered data is up to date. This includes the annual canvass, which in England, Scotland and Wales is the mandatory process where the Electoral Registration Officer seeks to contact all households in their area. The canvass must include at least one mailing to each address, but can also be carried out by phone or going door to door.

The Electoral Registration Officer also plays an important role in increasing voter registration, by carrying out house to house enquiries throughout the year. They are charged with increasing voter participation in the electoral process.

Any expenses incurred by an Electoral Registration Officer in the performance of their functions are paid by the local authority which made the appointment, except in Northern Ireland, where the Chief Electoral Officer's expenses are covered by the Northern Ireland Office.

== Appointment ==
=== England ===
In England, every district council is required to appoint an officer of the council to be the electoral registration officer. In the City of London, the Court of Common Council must appoint an officer as the electoral registration officer.

=== Northern Ireland ===
In Northern Ireland, the Electoral Office for Northern Ireland (led by the Chief Electoral Officer for Northern Ireland) is responsible for electoral registration.

=== Scotland ===
In Scotland, every local authority is required to appoint an officer of that council or an adjoining council, or jointly appoint an officer in conjunction with other local authorities as the electoral registration officer.

=== Wales ===
In Wales, every county borough council is required to appoint an officer of the council to be the electoral registration officer.

== See also ==
- Elections in the United Kingdom
- Electoral Commission (United Kingdom)
- Get out the vote
