= Chief Electoral Officer for Northern Ireland =

Returning and electoral registration officer

Chief Electoral Officer of Northern Ireland
- Incumbent; David Marshall since 7 August 2023
- Type: Returning officer

The Chief Electoral Officer for Northern Ireland is the returning officer and electoral registration officer for all elections in Northern Ireland and is in charge of the Electoral Office for Northern Ireland. The Electoral Office is an "independent, non-partisan body" which is charged with assisting the Chief Electoral Officer with "running elections and compiling the electoral register".

The Chief Electoral Officer is tasked with making a recommendation to the Secretary of State for Northern Ireland by 16 April each year regarding whether a registration canvass should be conducted, and acting as an assessor to the Boundary Commission for Northern Ireland and the Local Government Boundaries Commissioner.

Since 7 August 2023, the role of Chief Electoral Officer has been held by David Marshall. The role had been held by Virginia McVea from February 2017, and Graham Shields served as Chief Electoral Officer from late 2010.
