= Ruth Deech, Baroness Deech =

British academic, lawyer, bioethicist and politician (born 1943)

The Right Honourable The Baroness Deech DBE
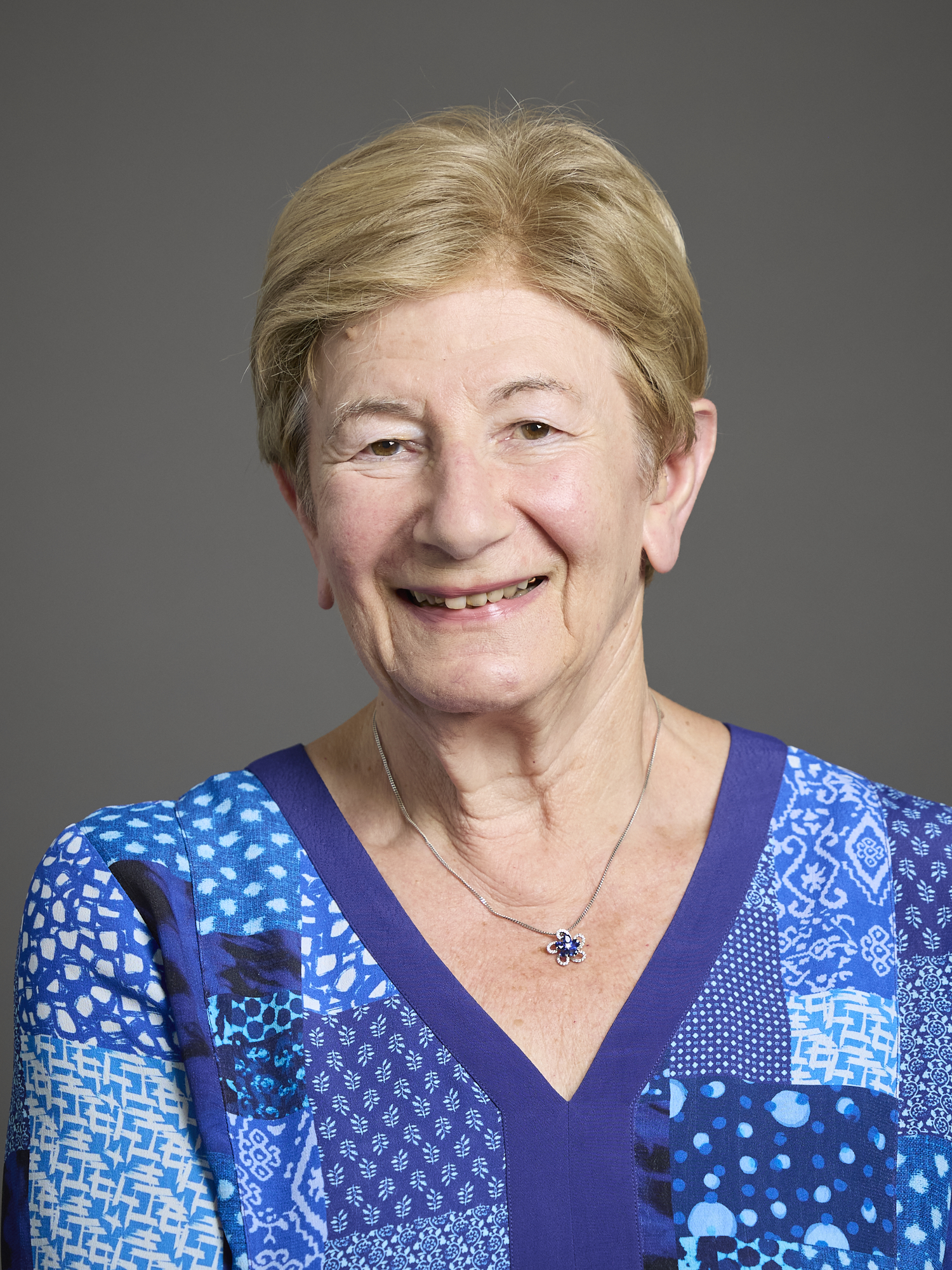
- Official portrait, 2026

Chair of the House of Lords Appointments Commission
- Incumbent
- Assumed office 26 October 2023
- Preceded by: The Lord Bew

Principal of St Anne's College, Oxford
- In office 1991–2004
- Preceded by: Claire Palley
- Succeeded by: Tim Gardam

Member of the House of Lords
- Lord Temporal
- Life peerage 5 October 2005

Personal details
- Born: Ruth Lynn Deech; 29 April 1943 (age 83) Clapham, London, England
- Education: St Anne's College, Oxford
- Occupation: Politician
- Profession: Academic; Lawyer; Bioethicist

Ruth Lynn Deech, Baroness Deech, DBE (née Fraenkel; born 29 April 1943) is a British academic, bioethicist and politician, most noted for chairing the Human Fertilisation and Embryology Authority (HFEA), from 1994 to 2002, and as the former Principal of St Anne's College, Oxford. Deech sits as a Crossbench peer in the House of Lords (2005–) and chaired the Bar Standards Board (2009–2014).

== Early life, family and education ==
Born in Clapham, London, Deech is the daughter of historian and journalist, Josef Fraenkel who was born in 1903 in Ustrzyki Dolne in south-east Poland. She states that she comes from a "very culturally Jewish family". Her father "was born in Poland and fled, first to Vienna and then Prague, from the Nazis". He arrived in Britain on 3 September 1939, the day the Allies declared war on Germany. Documents show that he travelled first from Poland to Nazi Germany (Vienna, Prague) and then arrived in Great Britain. Several other members of their family were murdered in Nazi concentration camps during World War II. Her first cousin is Maurice Frankel, Director of the UK Campaign for Freedom of Information.

She was educated at Christ's Hospital school, when the girls part of the school was located in Hertford. She graduated from St Anne's College, Oxford with a first in Law in 1965.

== Career ==
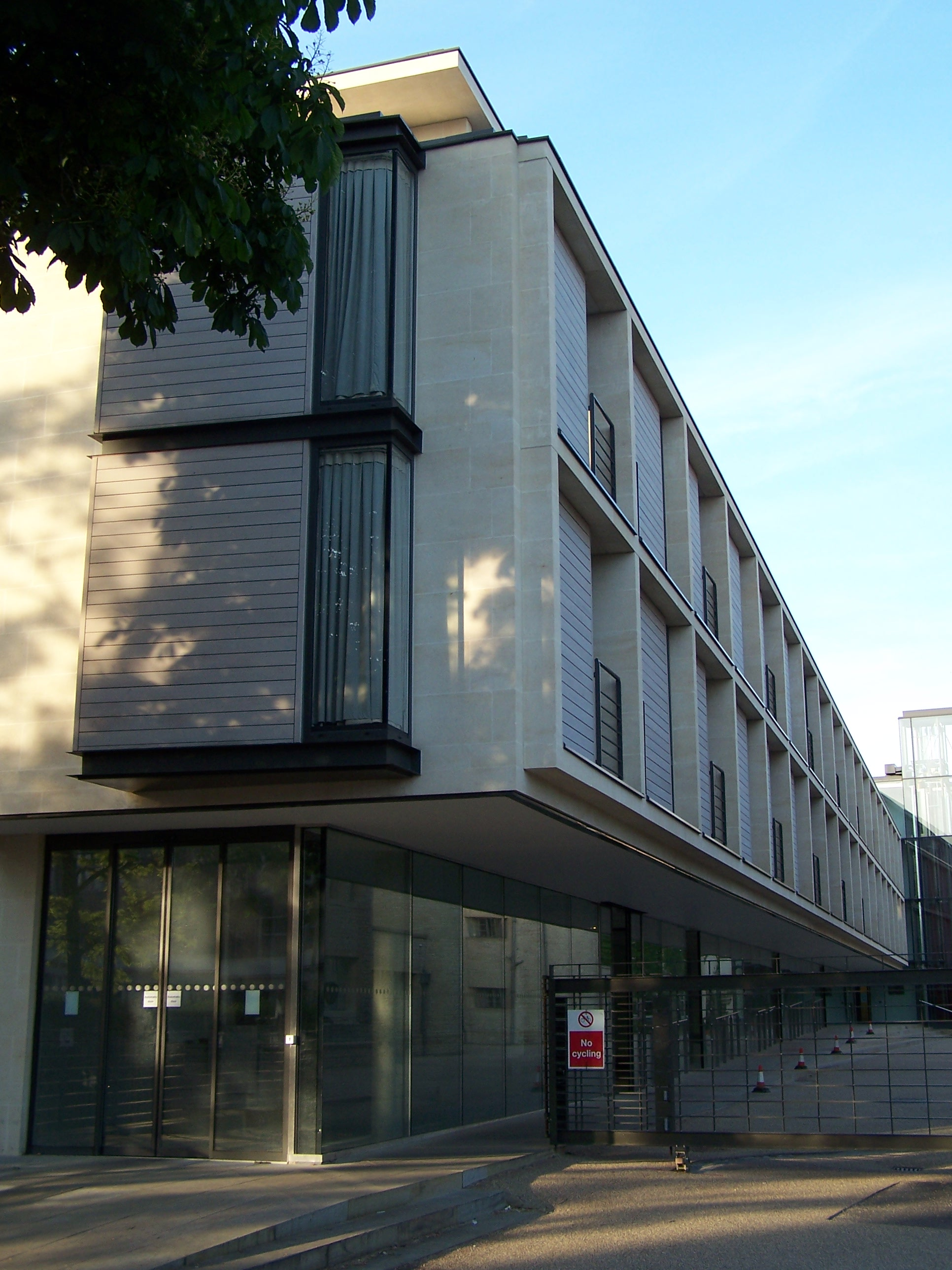
The Ruth Deech Building, St Anne's College, Oxford

Deech returned to St Anne's College, Oxford, in 1970 to be a tutorial fellow in Law, a post she retained until 1991 when she was elected principal of the college. She retired in 2004, and was succeeded by Tim Gardam. The college named the Ruth Deech Building, which was completed in 2005, after her.

Deech held many other positions during her career; she served as Senior Proctor of the University of Oxford between 1985 and 1986, as a member of the University's Hebdomadal Council of the UK Human Fertilisation and Embryology Authority from 1994 until 2002, and was appointed to a four-year term as a Governor of the BBC in 2002, the same year that she was made a Dame Commander of the Order of the British Empire (DBE), in recognition of her work at the HFEA.

After leaving St. Anne's, Deech was appointed the first Independent Adjudicator for Higher Education from 2004 to 2008, dealing with the resolution of student complaints at all UK universities.

On 22 July 2005, it was announced by the House of Lords Appointments Commission that she would be made a life peer, sitting as a crossbencher. On 5 October 2005, she was created Baroness Deech, of Cumnor in the County of Oxfordshire, and introduced in the House of Lords on 25 October 2005. She delivered her maiden speech on 24 November 2005.

In 1999, The Observer newspaper named her as the 107th most powerful person in Britain, and in 2001, Deech was placed at no.26 in Channel 4's "The God List", which ranked "the fifty people of faith in Britain who exercise the most power and influence over our lives". In November 2007, Deech published IVF to Immortality: Controversy in the Era of Reproductive Technology, with co-author Anna Smajdor.

Between 2004 and 2008, Deech was Independent Adjudicator for Higher Education and a Professor of Law at Gresham College in London, where she gave a series of public lectures on family relationships and the law. Deech was also the Chair of the Bar Standards Board between 2009-2015.

Deech has been a Director of JNF-UK In December 2016 Deech argued that Jewish students at UK universities were subject to increasing anti-Semitism. She is a Patron of the activist group UK Lawyers for Israel.

In June 2020, Baroness Deech accused Secretary of State for Housing, Communities and Local Government Robert Jenrick of breaching "the guidance on planning propriety" over his management of a planning application to build a national Holocaust memorial, which she described as controversial.

In October 2023, she was announced as Chair of the House of Lords Appointments Commission for a five-year term.

On 31 July 2025, she was a signatory of a letter from 38 House of Lords members opposing the UK's plan to recognise a State of Palestine: the peers said Palestine “does not meet the international law criteria for recognition of a state, namely, defined territory, a permanent population, an effective government and the capacity to enter into relations with other states”.

== Returned family property ==
In 2008, it emerged that Eugeniusz Waniek, a 101-year-old Polish artist and art professor living in Kraków, had in his possession a set of silver cutlery which had once belonged to Deech's father's family, the Fraenkels. Waniek had been a Polish Christian neighbour and friend of the Fraenkels in pre-war Ustrzyki Dolne, a small town near the Polish/Ukrainian border. Deech's grandfather, Moses Fraenkel, owned an oil refinery there had been a long-serving mayor of the town.

Nazi German troops raided Ustrzyki Dolne in September 1942, rounding up the town's large Jewish population. Deech's aunt, Helena Fraenkel, managed to pass a bundle of the silverware to Waniek for safekeeping, risking her life in doing so. Other Jews in the town were shot for refusing to hand over valuables to Nazis. Helena was murdered in the Belzec extermination camp. Waniek looked after the silver, at one stage burying it in his garden to hide it from the Nazis, which would have also been punishable by death. He never saw the Fraenkels again.

The story was uncovered by a neighbour of Waniek's, Marek Marko, and historian Professor Norman Davies in 2008. When Deech and her British family visited Waniek, he presented to them the silverware (and the tablecloth that bundled it) that he had kept in a drawer for 67 years. He died 8 months later, aged 102.

Deech has criticized Poland regarding its policy for compensation of goods stolen during German occupation. In May 2019, Deech claimed during a House of Lords debate that Poland is “squatting on property of 3 million Shoah victims” and that it was the "most egregious offender” when it came to returning Nazi loot”.

== See also ==
- House of Lords, Crossbench Peers

Academic offices
Preceded by Claire Palley	Principal of St Anne's College, Oxford; 1991—2004	Succeeded by Tim Gardam
Other offices
Preceded by The Lord Bew	Chairwoman of the House of Lords Appointments Commission; 2023–present	Incumbent
