= Charlie Falconer, Baron Falconer of Thoroton =

British politician, peer and barrister (born 1951)

The Right Honourable The Lord Falconer of Thoroton PC KC
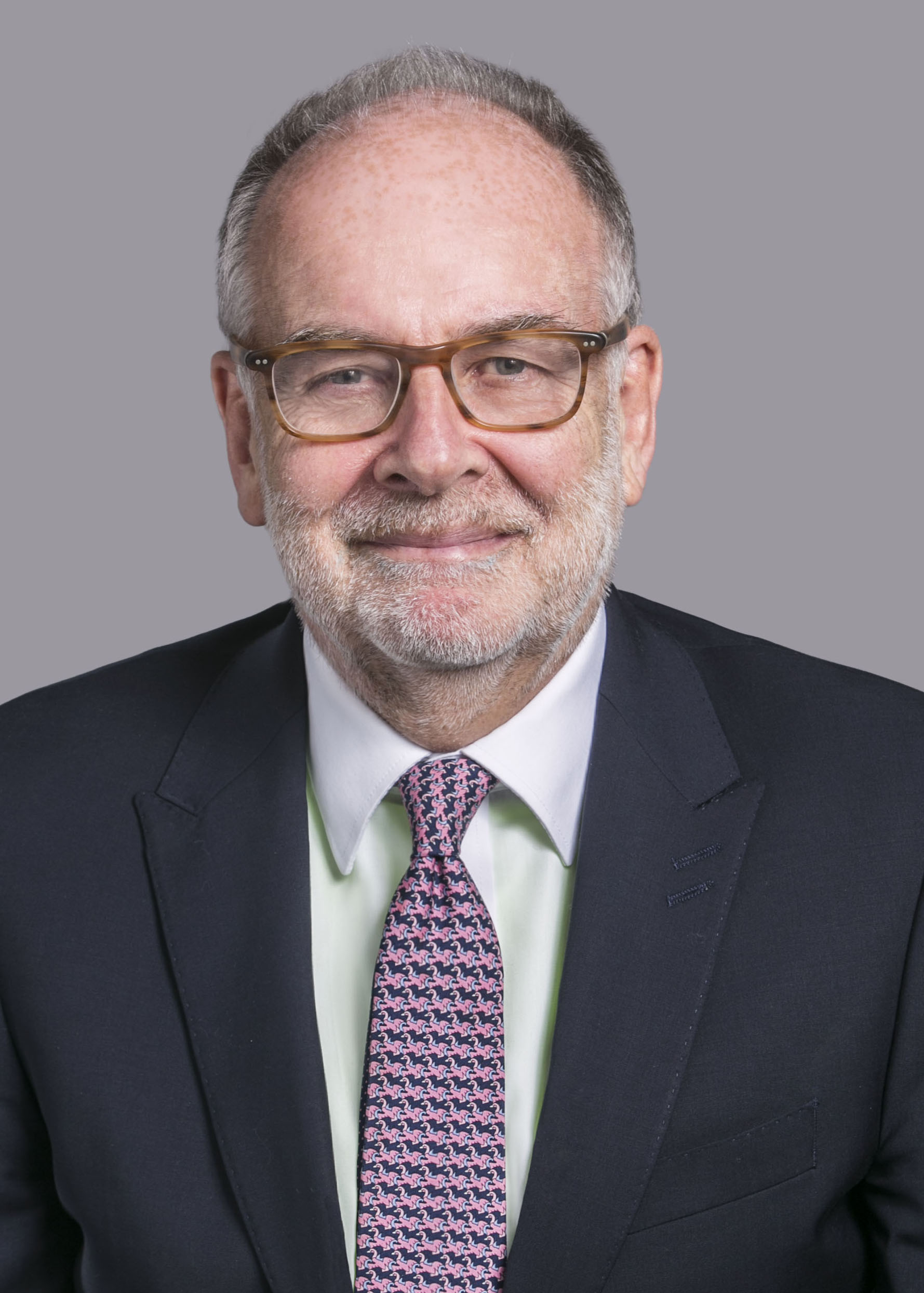
- Studio portrait, 2017

Secretary of State for Justice (Note: The office was Secretary of State for Constitutional Affairs until 8 May 2007, when elements of the Home Office were assigned to the Department for Constitutional Affairs to create the Ministry of Justice.); Lord Chancellor
- In office 12 June 2003 – 28 June 2007
- Monarch: Elizabeth II
- Prime Minister: Tony Blair
- Preceded by: The Lord Irvine of Lairg (Note: As Lord Chancellor. Falconer was the inaugural holder of the office of Secretary of State for Constitutional Affairs.)
- Succeeded by: Jack Straw
Junior ministerial offices
Minister of State for Criminal Justice, Sentencing and Law Reform
In office 29 May 2002 – 12 June 2003
Prime Minister	Tony Blair
Preceded by	David Maclean (Note: Office vacant between 2 May 1997 and 29 May 2002.)
Succeeded by	The Baroness Scotland of Asthal
Minister of State for Housing, Planning and Regeneration
In office 11 June 2001 – 29 May 2002
Prime Minister	Tony Blair
Preceded by	Nick Raynsford
Succeeded by	The Lord Rooker
Minister of State for the Cabinet Office
In office 28 July 1998 – 11 June 2001
Prime Minister	Tony Blair
Preceded by	Office established
Succeeded by	The Baroness Morgan of Huyton; Barbara Roche
Solicitor General for England and Wales
In office 6 May 1997 – 28 July 1998
Prime Minister	Tony Blair
Preceded by	Derek Spencer
Succeeded by	Ross Cranston
Shadow cabinet portfolios
Shadow Attorney General
In office 6 April 2020 – 29 November 2021
Leader	Keir Starmer
Preceded by	The Baroness Chakrabarti
Succeeded by	Emily Thornberry
Shadow Advocate General for Scotland
In office 18 May 2021 – 29 November 2021
Leader	Keir Starmer
Preceded by	The Lord Davidson of Glen Clova
Succeeded by	The Lord Keen of Elie (2024)
Shadow Secretary of State for Justice Shadow Lord Chancellor
In office 11 May 2015 – 26 June 2016
Leader	Harriet Harman; Jeremy Corbyn
Preceded by	Sadiq Khan
Succeeded by	Richard Burgon

Member of the House of Lords
- Lord Temporal
- Life peerage 14 May 1997

Personal details
- Born: Charles Leslie Falconer; 19 November 1951 (age 74) Edinburgh, Scotland
- Party: Labour
- Spouse: Marianna Catherine Thornton Hildyard (m. 1985)
- Children: Hamish, William "Rocco", Rosie, Johnny
- Education: Queens' College, Cambridge

Charles Leslie Falconer, Baron Falconer of Thoroton, PC, KC (born 19 November 1951) is a British Labour politician, peer and barrister who served as Lord Chancellor and Secretary of State for Justice under Prime Minister Tony Blair from 2003 to 2007.

Born in Edinburgh, Falconer read law at Queens' College, Cambridge and then worked as a barrister in London. During his time as a barrister, he was a flatmate of Tony Blair. Although Blair went into politics, Falconer focused on his legal career and became a Queen's Counsel. After Blair was elected as Prime Minister, Falconer was created a life peer and made Solicitor General for England and Wales. He is the only known person to have served as Solicitor General as a peer. Later, he served successively as Minister of State for the Cabinet Office, Minister of State for Housing, Planning and Regeneration and Minister of State for Criminal Justice, Sentencing and Law Reform.

In 2003, Falconer became the Lord Chancellor and the first Secretary of State for Constitutional Affairs. He went on to become the first Secretary of State for Justice in a 2007 reorganisation and enlargement of the portfolio of the Department for Constitutional Affairs, and held this role for over a month until Gordon Brown became Prime Minister in June 2007. Falconer was named Shadow Justice Secretary under the acting leadership of Harriet Harman in 2015, and continued in this role after the election of Jeremy Corbyn as leader of the party, until he resigned on 26 June 2016. He was appointed as Shadow Attorney General in the Starmer shadow cabinet in April 2020, and stepped down from the role in November 2021.

== Early life and career ==
Charles Leslie Falconer was born in Edinburgh, Scotland, on 19 November 1951, the son of John Leslie Falconer, a solicitor, and his wife Anne Mansel. His paternal grandfather was John Ireland Falconer, a former Lord Provost of Edinburgh. Falconer was educated at the Edinburgh Academy and Trinity College, Glenalmond. He read law at Queens' College, Cambridge. Lord Falconer is Jewish.

Falconer became a flatmate of Tony Blair when they were both young barristers in London in the late 1970s in Wandsworth, having first met as pupils at rival Scottish schools in the 1960s. While Blair went into politics, Falconer concentrated on his legal career. He practised from Fountain Court Chambers in London, and became a Queen's Counsel in 1991.

Falconer applied to be the Labour candidate for the safe seat of Dudley North ahead of the 1997 general election, but he "fluffed" his interview with the Labour constituency committee by refusing to take his four children out of public schools. Barrister Ross Cranston was selected instead and won the seat, holding it from 1997 to 2005. Cranston succeeded Falconer as Solicitor General for England and Wales, serving from 1998 to 2001.

== Ennoblement and junior ministerial career ==
On 14 May 1997, just after Blair became Prime Minister, Falconer was created a life peer as Baron Falconer of Thoroton, of Thoroton in the County of Nottinghamshire. He was the first peer created on the new Prime Minister's recommendation, and immediately joined the government as Solicitor General.

Falconer became Minister of State at the Cabinet Office in 1998, taking over responsibility for the Millennium Dome following the resignation of Peter Mandelson. He acquired the nickname of "Dome Secretary" (a play on the position of Home Secretary) over time. He was heavily criticised for the failure of the Dome to attract an audience, but resisted calls for his resignation. This was in contrast to the sacking of Dome chief executive Jennie Page just one month after the fiasco of the New Millennium eve opening night.

Following the 2001 election, Falconer joined the Department for Transport, Local Government and the Regions as Minister for Housing, Planning and Regeneration. He moved on to the Home Office in 2002, being given responsibility for criminal justice, sentencing and law reform. He reportedly annoyed some of his fellow lawyers by suggesting that their fees were too high.

== Cabinet minister, 2003–2007 ==
In 2003 Falconer joined the Cabinet as the Secretary of State for Constitutional Affairs, becoming also Lord Chancellor "for the interim period" before the office was planned to be abolished. The government argued that the position of a cabinet minister as a judge and head of the judiciary was no longer appropriate and would not be upheld by the European Convention on Human Rights.

The announcement was generally seen as a rushed "back-of-an-envelope" plan. There had been no green paper discussions nor white paper proposals; and it became something of a shock to realise that the proposed abolition of the office of Lord Chancellor would require primary legislation. The policy of removing the Lord Chancellor's judicial role was said to be disliked by Lord Irvine of Lairg, the previous Lord Chancellor.

The post of Secretary of State for Constitutional Affairs took over the remaining responsibilities of the Lord Chancellor, and also became the sponsoring department for the Secretary of State for Wales and the Secretary of State for Scotland. Falconer announced his intention not to use the Lord Chancellor's power to sit as a judge and stopped wearing the traditional robe and wig of office. Falconer hoped to be the last to hold the title, ending 1,400 years of tradition.

However, in 2006 Falconer told the House of Lords Constitution Committee that he regretted campaigning for the abolition of the role of Lord Chancellor and was glad the title had been reserved. In his opinion, the office "still had a role to play in defending the independence of the courts."

=== Freedom of Information Act ===
In his role as Secretary of State for Constitutional Affairs, Falconer sought to make it easier for government bodies to refuse to release documents under the Freedom of Information Act (2000), on the grounds that they are too expensive and too time-consuming for civil servants to find. The legislation allowed requests for information to be refused if the cost they would incur exceeded £600 for Whitehall and £450 for other public bodies. Falconer proposed changes that would make no difference to this level, but would expand the number of activities whose cost would be included in the totals, thus making it easier for government parties to refuse requests for information. At the end of March 2007, Falconer's department announced that it would not introduce the proposals to parliament, but would instead have a second three-month consultation with the public (the previous consultation, also of three months, ended three weeks previous to this). Media elements reported this change as a 'backtracking', and Maurice Frankel, director of the Campaign for Freedom of Information, was quoted as saying "This raises the strong possibility that the government will decide to leave the current arrangements untouched".

== Later parliamentary career, 2007– ==
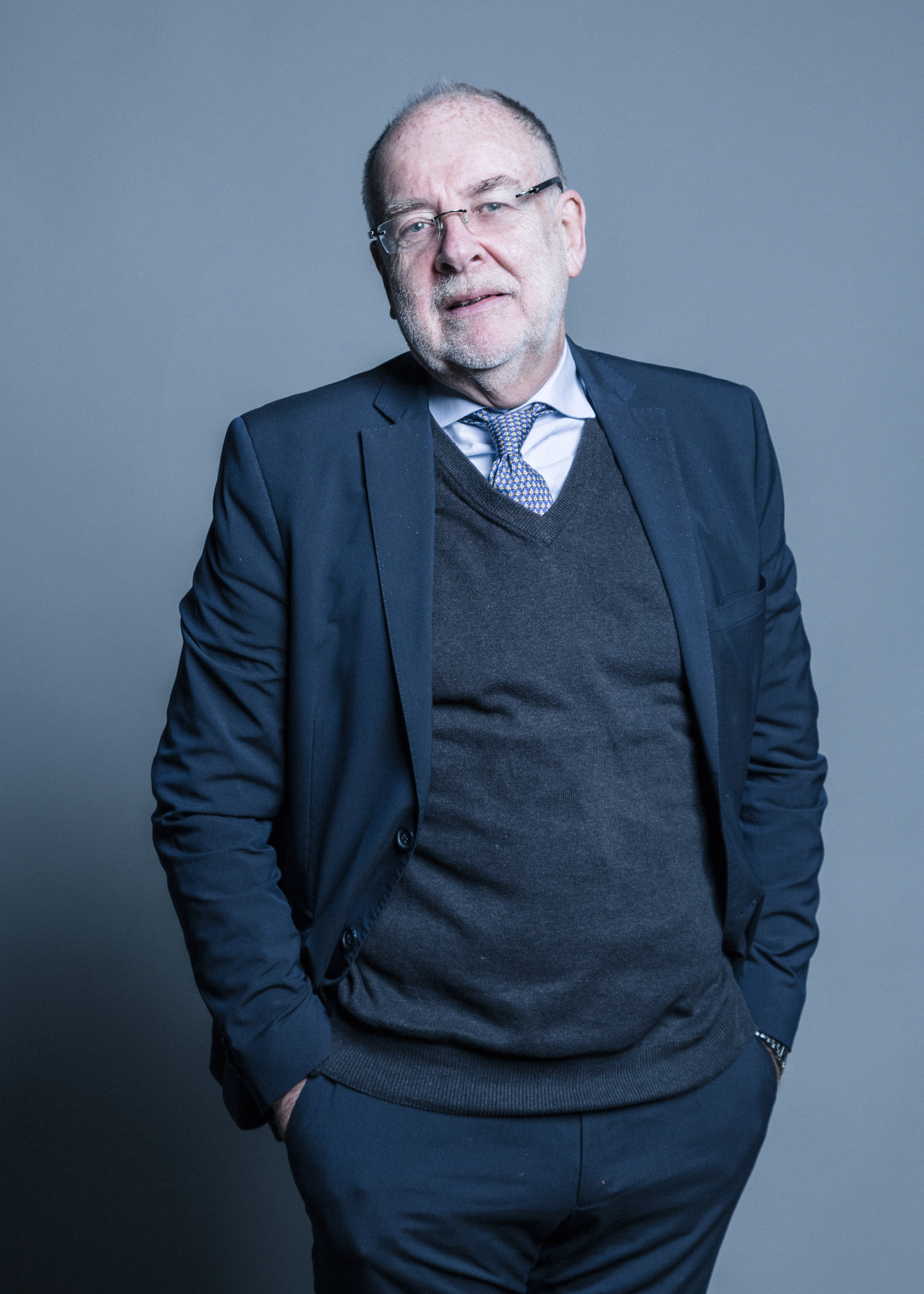
Official Parliamentary portrait in May 2018 by Chris McAndrew

Falconer was replaced in his ministerial posts by Jack Straw in Gordon Brown's inaugural cabinet reshuffle, with Straw becoming the first non-Member of the House of Lords to take up the office of Lord Chancellor.

In February 2008, Falconer told a BBC radio programme that the government should require certain news articles to be removed from online archives during sensitive trials. This move was questioned as the articles were readily available in printed newspapers and other physical media, presenting a possible misunderstanding of the internet as a medium.

On 7 June 2009, while being interviewed by the BBC Politics Show, Falconer called for an urgent debate on Gordon Brown's leadership, as Labour braced itself for "terrible" election results at the 2009 European Parliament Elections, following being "humiliated" at the 2009 County Council elections. He said he was "not sure" Labour could unite while Brown remained leader, arguing "can we get unity under the current leadership? I am not sure that we can and we need to debate it urgently and I think probably it will need a change in leader." He said he admired Gordon Brown "greatly" but said he had an "inability to hold the party together".

In 2014, Falconer proposed the Assisted Dying Bill to the House of Lords, which seeks to legalise euthanasia in the UK for those who have less than six months to live, building on the experience of the Oregon Death with Dignity Act.

Falconer was named Shadow Secretary of State for Justice under the acting leadership of Harriet Harman in 2015, and continued in this role following the election of Jeremy Corbyn as leader of the party, until—along with dozens of his colleagues—he resigned on 26 June 2016. He was appointed Shadow Attorney General in the Starmer shadow cabinet on 6 April 2020, but stepped down following a shadow cabinet reshuffle in November 2021.

In 2018, he apologised for his role as Lord Chancellor in the war on drugs, and now thought drug prohibition had been a "tragic disaster" for the poor worldwide. He thought governments should take control of drug supply, thus reducing the involvement of violent gangs, and proposed that the legal regulation of drug production and supply should be in the next Labour manifesto.

== Extraparliamentary activities ==
Since leaving office, Falconer has gone on to hold various positions outside Parliament. On 22 May 2008, it was announced that he had been appointed as Chairman of the AmicusHorizon Group Limited, a Registered Social Landlord.

On 8 July 2008, Falconer joined US law firm Gibson, Dunn & Crutcher as a senior counsel, where he remained as late as April 2021. At this time, the Greensill scandal caused controversy over his advice to extramural firms in relation to the COVID-19 pandemic in the UK, which he once called "the gift that keeps on giving" for lawyers; however, he regretted saying this.

From 2022 to 2025, Falconer served as Chair of the London Drugs Commission, set up by Mayor of London Sadiq Khan to consider possible reforms to the UK's cannabis policy.

== Personal life ==
He married Marianna Catherine Thoroton Hildyard, a barrister, in 1985. She became a QC in 2002. Hildyard is a Circuit Judge, known as Her Honour Judge Hildyard KC, and the Designated Family Judge for Luton. Her father, Sir David Henry Thoroton Hildyard (grandson of Gen. Sir Henry John Thoroton Hildyard), was the British Ambassador to Chile and her brother, Sir Robert Henry Thoroton Hildyard, is a High Court Judge. They have four children: Hamish, William "Rocco", Rosie and Johnny. Falconer placed his three sons at independent Westminster School and St Paul's School, and his daughter at South Hampstead High School. In the lead-up to the 1997 election, as he attempted to be selected for the seat of Dudley East, it proved to be an electoral problem for Falconer. He intended to keep his children at Westminster if selected, which caused the local selection panel to drop him from the selection procedure.

Falconer was chairman of Cambridge University Amnesty International between 2006 and 2007, and is the director of Sudan Divestment. He is chairman of the board for a social enterprise set up at Pentonville Prison, Liberty Kitchen.

Falconer lost over five stone between 2012 and 2014, consuming only Diet Coke and apples apart from dinner, eschewing tea, coffee and alcohol, and jogging for 45 minutes a day.

In the general election in July 2024, his son Hamish was elected as MP for Lincoln.

== Arms ==
Coat of arms of Charlie Falconer, Baron Falconer of Thoroton
Notes Displayed on a gilded ceiling panel in the House of Lords. Crest A falcon Or supporting with the dexter claws a pilgrim's pikestaff connected by a chain Argent to a ring around the sinister leg also Argent. Escutcheon Per pale Or and Argent two barrulets per pale Ermine and Erminois over all a falcon's head erased Azure grasping in the beak pendent a Mediterranean sweet briar rose affronty Proper slipped Sable all between three mullets Azure. Supporters On either side a falcon Or murally gorged Argent masoned Sable the exterior leg of each falcon standing on a bugle horn Azure banded Argent the bell inwards that to the dexter with a round buckle Or attached to the collar by a line Azure and that to the sinister with a falcon's bell attached to the collar by a line Azure.

== Notes ==
Legal offices
Preceded by Derek Spencer	Solicitor General for England and Wales; 1997–1998	Succeeded by Ross Cranston
Political offices
Preceded by Nick Raynsford	Minister of State for Housing and Planning; 2001–2002	Succeeded by Jeff Rooker
New office	Secretary of State for Constitutional Affairs; 2003–2007	Became Secretary of State for Justice
Preceded by The Lord Irvine of Lairg	Lord High Chancellor of Great Britain; 2003–2007	Succeeded by Jack Straw
New office	Secretary of State for Justice; 2007	Succeeded by Jack Straw
Preceded by Sadiq Khan	Shadow Secretary of State for Justice; 2015–2016	Succeeded by Richard Burgon
Preceded by Sadiq Khan	Shadow Lord Chancellor; 2015–2016	Succeeded by Richard Burgon
Parliament of the United Kingdom
Preceded by The Lord Irvine of Lairg	Presiding Officer of the House of Lords as Lord Chancellor; 2003–2006	Succeeded by The Baroness Hayman as Lord Speaker
Orders of precedence in the United Kingdom
Preceded by The Lord Lloyd-Webber	Gentlemen; Baron Falconer of Thoroton	Followed by The Lord Simon of Highbury
