= Secondary mandate =

The secondary mandate is a proposed system for indirectly electing the UK parliament's second chamber, as espoused by singer-songwriter-activist Billy Bragg.

The Secondary Mandate works by counting up the first past the post General Election votes by party at a regional level, and then distributing each party a number of seats roughly proportionately, through closed list proportional representation.

The system has attracted support from a number of Government ministers including Peter Hain and Lord Falconer of Thoroton. It has however been criticised for being little more than a system of appointment as the closed list system it uses puts too much power into the hands of the political parties themselves. It also greatly disadvantages smaller parties who may not field candidates in all constituency seats.
