= Tim Gardam =

British journalist

Tim Gardam CBE
- Born: 14 January 1956 (age 70)
- Education: Rokeby Preparatory School; Westminster School; University of Cambridge
- Occupations: Journalist, academic administrator

Timothy David Gardam CBE (born 14 January 1956) is a British journalist, media executive and educator. He was Director of Television at Channel 4 until 2003, after which he was principal of St Anne's College, Oxford until 2016. He was Chief Executive of the Nuffield Foundation between September 2016 and March 2024.

== Early life ==
Gardam was born on 14 January 1956 to the novelist Jane Gardam. He studied at Rokeby Preparatory School, Westminster School and Gonville and Caius College, Cambridge, where he obtained a double first in English.

== Career ==
He worked at the BBC (where he created Timewatch and edited Newsnight), and as director of programmes at Channel 4, commissioning the first series of Big Brother. He was then appointed by the Department of Culture, Media and Sport to lead a review of digital radio in Britain.

In January 2008, he began a three-year term on the board of Ofcom, the independent regulatory authority for the UK communications industries. He was subsequently reappointed for a second three-year term.

In 2004, he was elected Principal of St Anne's College, Oxford, succeeding Ruth Deech. His achievements included the construction of a new library and the St Anne's Coffee Shop (STACS), and the strengthening of college finances, academic performance, and outreach efforts. In early 2016, Gardam announced that he would be stepping down as principal at the end of the academic year, in order to become chief executive of the Nuffield Foundation.

He was Chairman of the Consumers' Association Council from 2015 to 2019.

Gardam was appointed Commander of the Order of the British Empire (CBE) in the 2024 New Year Honours for services to journalism and education.

Academic offices
Preceded by Ruth Deech	Principal of St Anne's College, Oxford; 2004–2016	Succeeded by Helen King
