= Robert Hildyard (judge) =

British Judge

The Honourable Mr Justice Hildyard
- Royal coat of arms of the United Kingdom

Justice of the High Court
- Incumbent
- Assumed office 3 October 2011
- Appointed by: Elizabeth II

Personal details
- Born: Robert Henry Thoroton Hildyard; 10 October 1952 (age 73)
- Spouse(s): Isabella Jane Rennie (m. 1980; div. 2010) Lucy Gibson
- Children: 4
- Education: Christ Church, Oxford
- Occupation: High Court Judge
- Profession: Law

Sir Robert Henry Thoroton Hildyard, styled Mr Justice Hildyard (born 10 October 1952), is a British High Court Judge.

== Personal life and education ==
Hildyard was educated at Eton College and Christ Church, Oxford. In 1980 he married Isabella Jane Rennie, with whom he had three daughters. They divorced and he later married Lucy Gibson and had another daughter, living at their country house Flintham Hall, Nottinghamshire. He is a member of the Garrick Club.

Hildyard is the brother-in-law of Charles Falconer, Baron Falconer of Thoroton, who served as Lord Chancellor and Secretary of State for Justice.

== Career ==
Hildyard was called to the Bar at Inner Temple in 1977 and joined Lincoln's Inn in 1994. He was appointed a Queen's Counsel in 1994, deputy judge of the High Court from 2002 to 2011, bencher of Lincoln's Inn in 2005 and was attorney-general to the Duchy of Lancaster from 2008 to 2011. He has been a judge of the High Court of Justice (Chancery Division) since 2011. He received his customary knighthood in 2012 from Queen Elizabeth II in St James's Palace.

He was made a deputy lieutenant for Nottinghamshire in 2014.
