= St Anne's College, Oxford =

College of Oxford University, England

St Anne's College
- University of Oxford
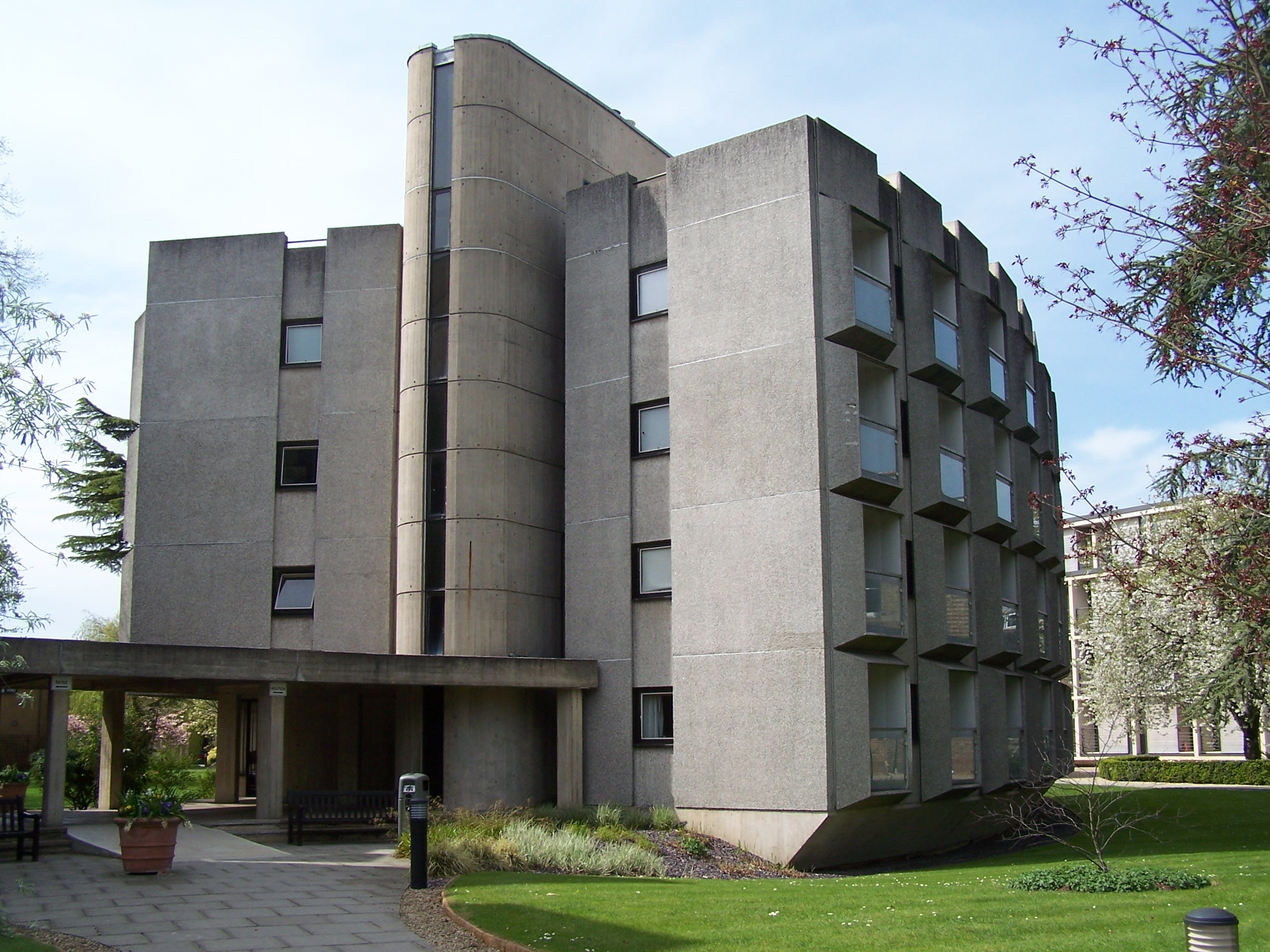
- Wolfson Building, St Anne's College

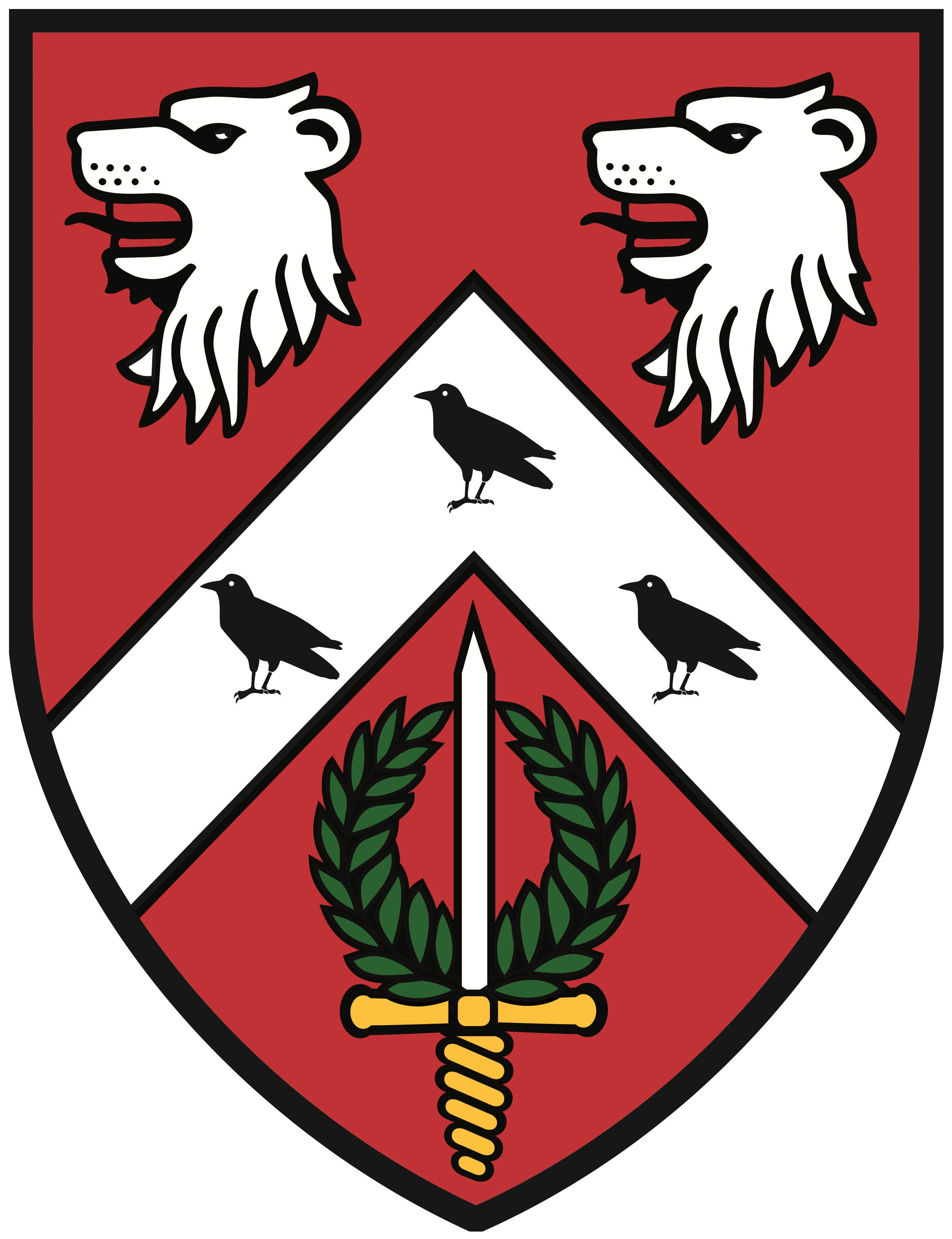
- Arms: Gules, on a chevron between in chief two lions heads erased argent, and in base a sword of the second pummelled and hilt or and enfiled with a wreath of laurel, three ravens, all proper
- Location: Woodstock Road and Banbury Road
- Coordinates: 51.7620°N 1.2617°W
- Latin name: Collegium Sanctae Annae
- Motto: Consulto et audacter (Purposefully and boldly)
- Established: 1879
- Named for: Saint Anne
- Former names: The Society of Oxford Home-Students (1879–1942); The St Anne's Society (1942–1952)
- Sister college: Murray Edwards College, Cambridge
- Principal: Helen King
- Undergraduates: 444
- Postgraduates: 250
- Mascot: Beaver
- Endowment: £40.6 million (2020)
- Website: www.st-annes.ox.ac.uk
- Boat club: St Anne's College Boat Club

Map
- Location within Oxford city centre Location within Oxford

St Anne's College is a constituent college of the University of Oxford in England. It was founded in 1879 and gained full college status in 1959. Originally a women's college, it has admitted men since 1979. It has some 450 undergraduate and 200 graduate students and retains an original aim of allowing women of any financial background to study at Oxford. It still has a student base with a higher than average proportion of female students. The college stands between Woodstock and Banbury roads, next to the University Parks.

In April 2017, Helen King, a retired Metropolitan Police Assistant Commissioner, took over as Principal from Tim Gardam. Former members include Danny Alexander, Edwina Currie, Ruth Deech, Helen Fielding, William MacAskill, Amanda Pritchard, Simon Rattle, Tina Brown, Mr Hudson, Mākereti Papakura, and Victor Ubogu.

== History ==
=== Society of Oxford Home-Students (1879–1942) ===
What is now St Anne's College began as part of the Association for the Education of Women (AEW), the first institution in Oxford with that aim. It then became the Society of Oxford Home-Students. Unlike other women's associations, the society had no fixed site, instead offering lodgings in houses spread across Oxford. This allowed students of various financial backgrounds to study at Oxford, as the cost of accommodation in women's halls was often prohibitive. In the early 20th century, the college housed some students in hostels managed by Catholic and Anglican nuns. Springfield, St Mary was managed by Anglican nuns of the Community of St Mary the Virgin in houses in Banbury Road where they, and other hostels, "had to exercise control over their students according to the rules of the college". Other hostels were run by Catholic nuns: the Society of the Sacred Heart in Norham Gardens, the Sisters of Notre Dame in Woodstock Road and the Society of the Holy Child Jesus at Cherwell Edge in St Cross Road. Springfield St Mary was vacated by the nuns in 1966, to make way for the construction of the new Wolfson and Rayne buildings on the college site.

In 1910, the Society of Oxford Home-Students, with the other women's societies, was recognised by the university. In 1912, the society acquired its first four tutors, in German, History and English Literature, including Margaret Lucy Lee who held the position until she retired in 1936. In the 1920s, the principals of the women's societies became the first women to receive degrees from the university. The society in the early 1930s still had no centralised site, but within a few years the current location was chosen and by 1937 construction of Hartland House was underway.

=== St Anne's Society (1942–1952) ===
In 1942, the Society of Oxford Home-Students was renamed the St Anne's Society and given its coat of arms by Eleanor Plumer (Principal, 1940–1953). The name St Anne's was chosen as historically, there was a chapel of Saint Anne at the University Church of St Mary the Virgin where, from the college's earliest days, the whole student body would gather for termly services.

=== St Anne's College (1952 onwards) ===
In 1952, the St Anne's Society acquired a royal charter as St Anne's College and in 1959 full college status along with the other women's colleges. The Principal at the time, Mary Ogilvie, pressed for a transition from many disparate dining rooms to a common building. This led to the construction of the dining hall completed in 1959 and visited by Queen Elizabeth II in 1960. Meanwhile student numbers grew to nearly 300, which called for more accommodation and led to the construction of the Wolfson and Rayne buildings in 1964 and 1968. In 1977, the decision was made to become coeducational, with the first male undergraduates matriculating in 1979.

Since then, St Anne's has continued to use female words and pronouns, such as "alumnae" to refer to current and former students. The college explains this: "On 17 June 1979, in the nervous time when the first male Fellows had been elected, and the first male students admitted though they had not yet arrived, a note from the Dean to Governing Body asks hesitantly 'Would Governing Body wish "he" (or "he/she") to be substituted for "she" throughout the College Regulations?' Eventually the question was answered (or perhaps avoided) by a carefully worded statement that remains in the preamble to our Regulations: 'words importing the feminine gender shall include the masculine and vice versa, where the construction so permits and the Regulations do not otherwise expressly provide.'"

In 2023, work began on the full reconstruction of the Bevington Road accommodation blocks, in order to make them more suitable for future generations of students.

=== The Ship ===
The annual magazine for former college members is called The Ship. When still the Society of Oxford Home-Students, the college had its first common room in Ship Street, central Oxford. The Ship started up in about 1910; by the college centenary in 1979 there had been 69 issues. It marked its centenary issue of 2010/2011 with anniversary content.

== Location and buildings ==
=== Grounds ===
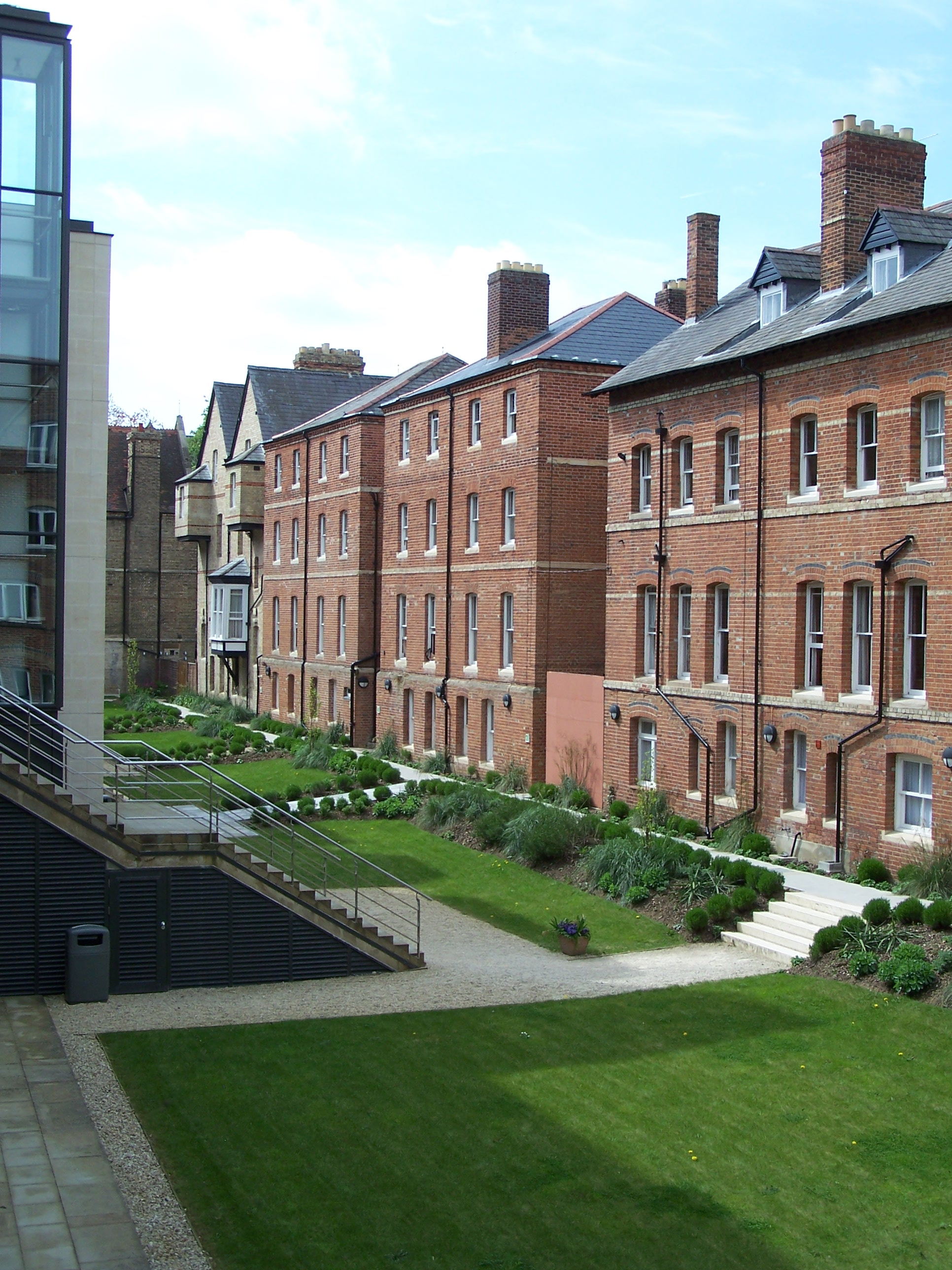
Rear of Bevington Road

The college grounds are bounded by Woodstock Road to the west, Banbury Road to the east, and Bevington Road to the north. These grounds house all of the college's administrative and academic buildings, undergraduate accommodation, as well as the hall, which is among the largest in Oxford. The College formerly owned a number of houses throughout Oxford used for undergraduate accommodation, some of which used to be boarding houses of the Society of Oxford Home-Students. Many of these properties were sold off to fund the building of the Ruth Deech Building, completed in 2005.

=== Accommodation ===
St Anne's generally accommodates undergraduates on the college site for two years of study, with students living out in their second year. Undergraduates at St Anne's are housed in 14 Victorian houses owned by the college and four purpose-built accommodation blocks. The college also supplies accommodation for some of its graduate students. All undergraduates pay the same amount for their rooms, and every student has access to a communal kitchen in their building.

==== Victorian houses ====
The college uses 1–10 Bevington Road (also known colloquially as "the Bevs"), 58/60 Woodstock Road, and 39/41 Banbury Road (also known as "Above the Bar") as undergraduate accommodation, typically for freshers. The junior (undergraduate) post room is located in 10 Bevington Road, the college laundry in 58/60 Woodstock Road, and the college bar, including a pool room, in 39/41 Banbury Road. Five additional Victorian houses (27/29 and 37 Banbury Road and 48/50 Woodstock Road) hold teaching rooms, seminar rooms, music practice rooms, and college offices. In July 2023, the Bevington Road accommodation began a two-year renovation project.

==== Rayne and Wolfson Buildings ====
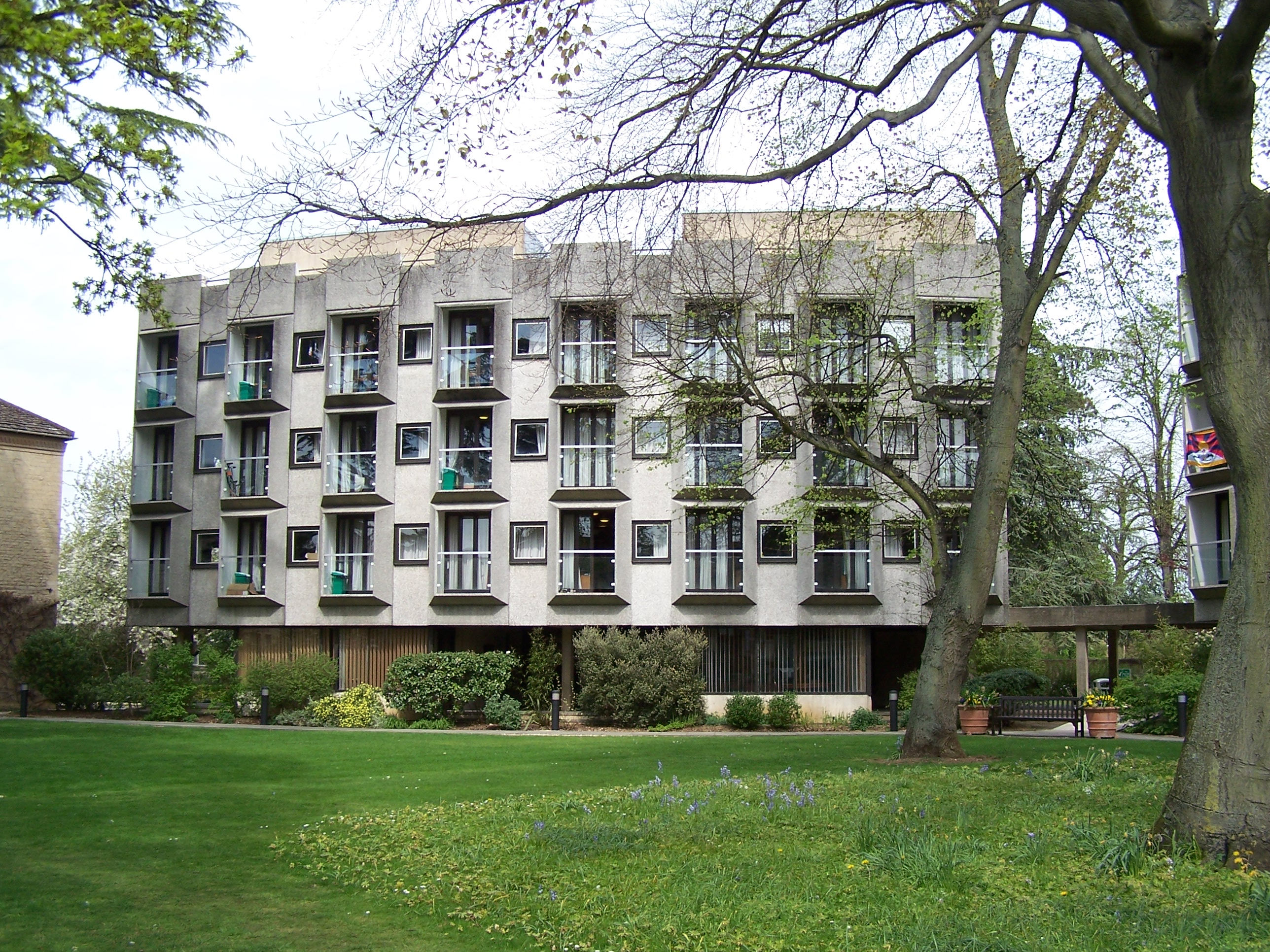
Wolfson Building

The Rayne and Wolfson Buildings were built in 1964 and are Grade II Listed Buildings virtually identical in design. They house administrative offices on the ground floor and student rooms. The majority of first years are housed here since the Bevington Road accommodation renovation project.

==== Claire Palley Building ====
The Claire Palley Building, completed in 1992 and named after Claire Palley (Principal 1984–1991), was the first accommodation block to have en-suite rooms. It also houses the Mary Ogilvie Lecture Theatre.

College bar

The College Bar is located on the ground floor of the building behind Trenaman House. There are some first-year rooms above the bar (known as 'ATB').

College Nursery

St Anne's College was home to the first college nursery at the University of Oxford. Founded in the 1960s, the nursery was a key step in enabling more opportunities for female academics. The college nursery operated in the historic original building at the back of the college and was well known for its community spirit and high standard of care. Only 12 children across all age groups attended the nursery and children from different age groups were able to interact freely. Unfortunately, the nursery long struggled with increasing regulatory burden. On 27 October 2026, the College published a news release announcing the closure of the college nursery due to a range of reasons, including "Ever more demanding regulatory, safeguarding and governance requirements for early years providers".

==== Trenaman House ====
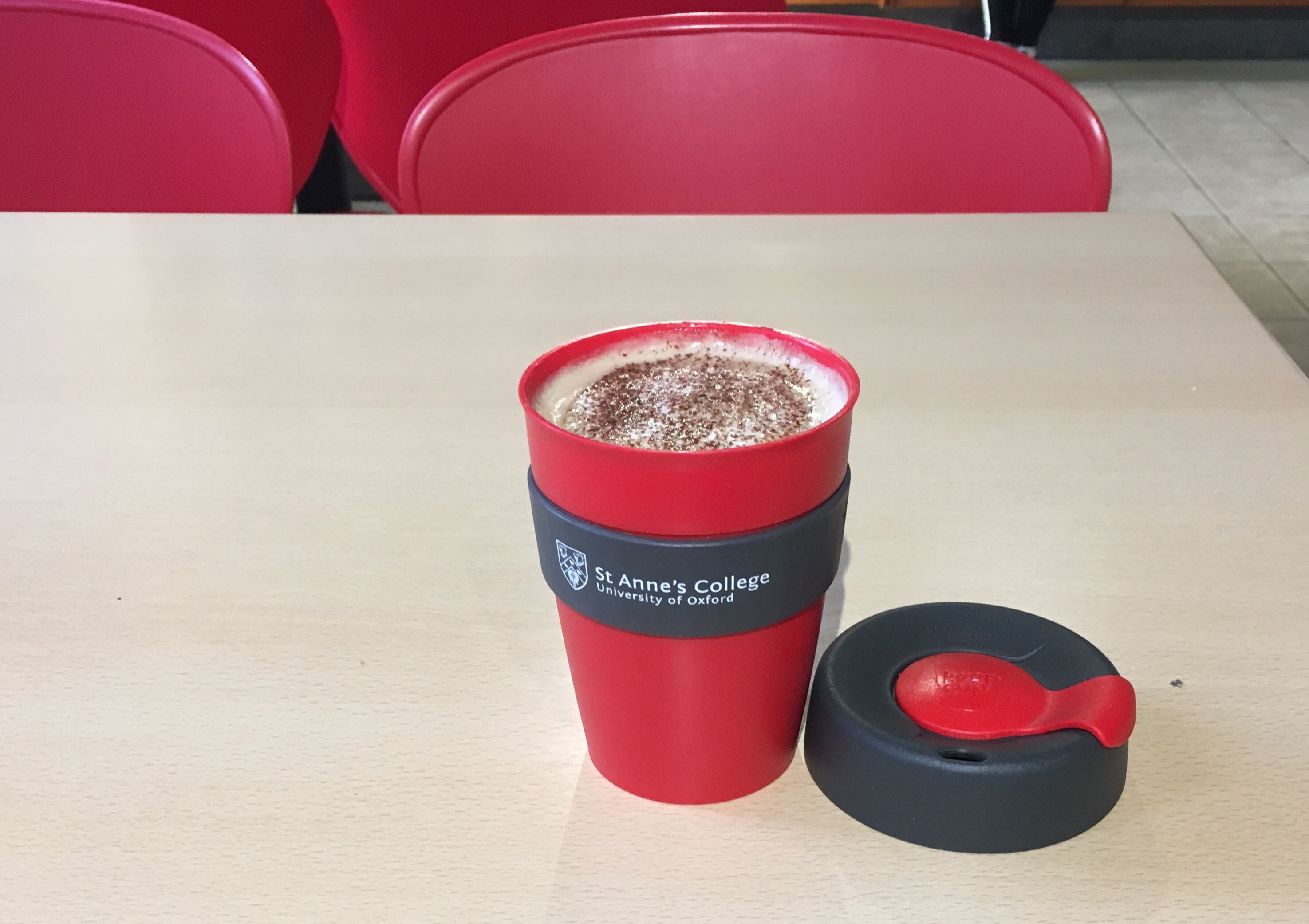
A STACS coffee, in a college branded KeepCup

Trenaman House, built in 1995, holds student rooms and communal college facilities, including the gym, and since 2008, St Anne's Coffee Shop (STACS). It was named after Nancy Trenaman, sixth Principal of the college (1966–1984).

==== Ruth Deech Building ====
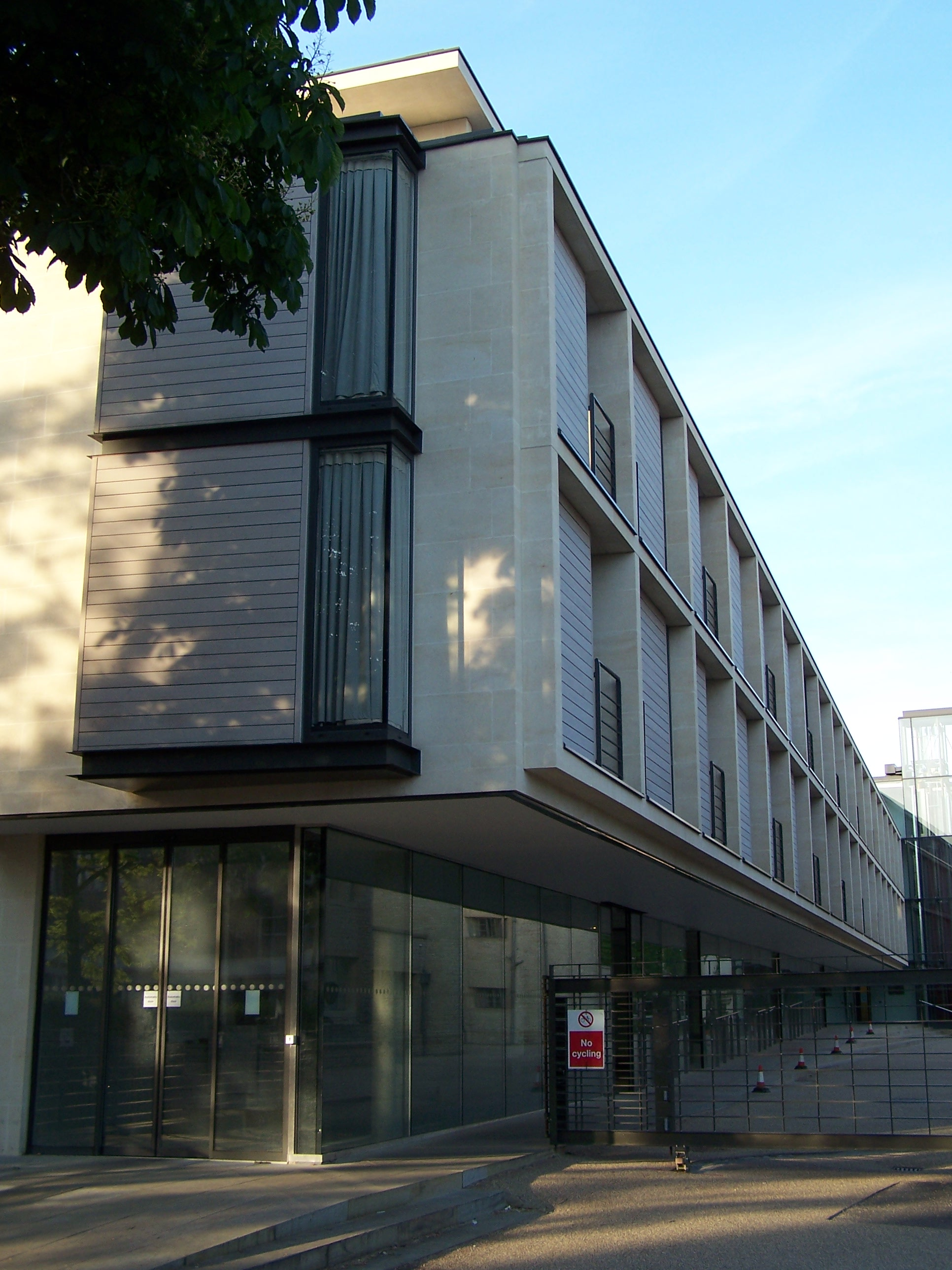
The Ruth Deech Building, which houses the Porter's Lodge

The Ruth Deech Building, named after the Principal in 1991–2004, was completed in 2005. The lower ground floor has the Tsuzuki lecture theatre, seminar rooms and dining facilities and a new Porter's Lodge on the upper ground floor with 110 en-suite student rooms. One notable feature is a glass lift, the only part of the building to exceed the roof line. The building was awarded the 2007 David Steel sustainable building award by Oxford City Council.

==== Robert Saunders House ====
Robert Saunders House, built in 1996, provides 80 rooms for graduate students in Summertown. It was named after a former bursar of the college, who did much to improve its finances.

==== Eleanor Plumer House ====
Eleanor Plumer House (known until 2008 as 35 Banbury Road) is named after Eleanor Plumer (Principal 1940–1953). It houses the Middle Common Room; facilities include a study area, computer room and kitchen. It also houses some graduate students.

Hartland House

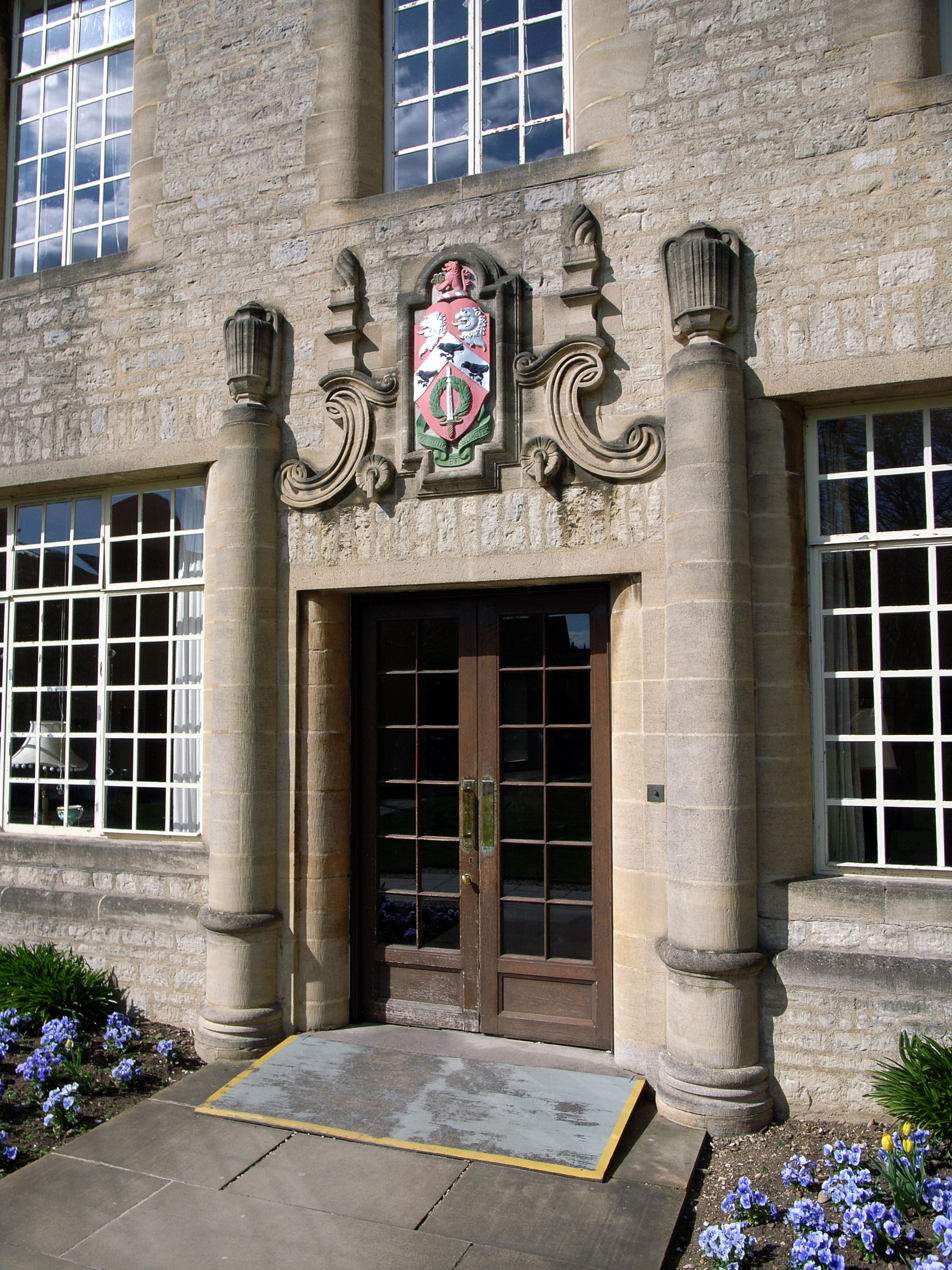
The first purpose-built college building and finished in 1937, the main entrance to Hartland House has the college's coat of arms and motto

Hartland House, designed by Giles Gilbert Scott, was the first purpose-built college building, finished in 1937 with another wing added in 1973. It houses the old library, the junior and senior common rooms and administrative offices. It features the college crest above the main entrance and engravings of beavers, the college mascot.

=== Dining Hall ===
The Dining Hall, built in 1959, is among the largest in Oxford with a capacity of 300. Three meals are served daily in hall apart from weekends, when only brunch is served. It is also used for college collections (internal college exams) and on occasion college 'bops' (costume parties).

=== Library ===
The college library has over 100,000 volumes, making it one of the largest in Oxford. It is split between the original library in Hartland House and the Tim Gardam building, which opened officially in 2017.

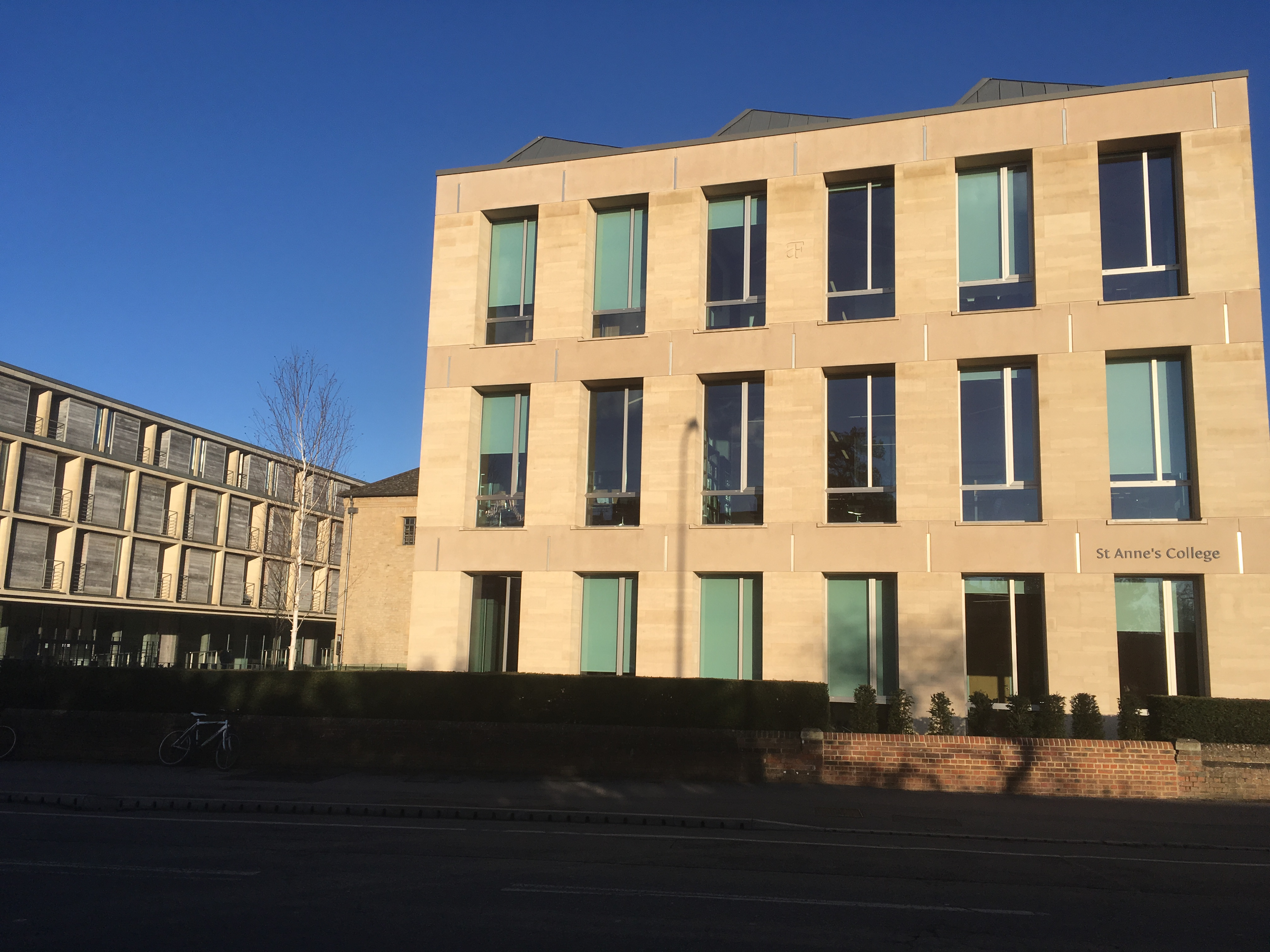
The Tim Gardam Building

The original college library in Hartland House now houses the law, arts, and humanities collections (Dewey Decimal shelfmarks 340–349 and 700–999).

The new library and academic centre was named after Tim Gardam (principal 2004–2016) and completed in 2016. It is on the site of the former Founders' Gatehouse, which was built in 1966 and was the college lodge until 2005. It covers the area previously taken by the 54 Woodstock Road cottage. The centre provides various study and seminar spaces and 1,500 metres of bookshelves for the college's growing book collection. The plans by Fletcher Priest Architects were inspired by Oxford's historic buildings.

The Tim Gardam Building also features two gardens; a roof garden overlooking the dining hall, and a sunken courtyard accessible through the basement.

== Traditions ==
The college has relatively few traditions and is rare amongst Oxford colleges in not having a chapel, due to its secular outlook. Formal hall is typically held fortnightly. Gowns are not usually worn except for official university occasions such as matriculation and certain college feasts. The college mascot has been a beaver since 1913.

=== College grace ===
The college grace was composed by former classics tutor and founding fellow Margaret Hubbard. It involves the Principal reciting the Latin words Quas decet, (Deo) gratias agamus. Amen. ("For what we have received, we give thanks (to God). Amen.") The inclusion of Deo (to God) depends on whether the grace is religious or secular in nature.

=== Room ballot ===
The college selects accommodation using a room ballot, with the exception of the first years. Those entering their fourth year select their rooms on the first day, followed by third-year rooms on the second day, and second-year rooms on the third and final day. Students are allocated a number within their year denoting their position in the ballot. In first year, this allocation is based on the quality of their previous year's accommodation. In second year, the JCR President, VP and Domestic Affairs Officer pull student numbers from a hat. Students would queue and rooms are allocated one by one. Rooms allocated are crossed off a large board listing all available rooms. Following the Covid-19 pandemic, the room ballot now occurs online, with a spreadsheet denoting available rooms shared with students. There is then a period of one week after the ballot where students can mutually agree on swaps. Unlike many colleges, JCR and MCR committee members receive no advantage in the room ballot for their position.

== Sport and societies ==
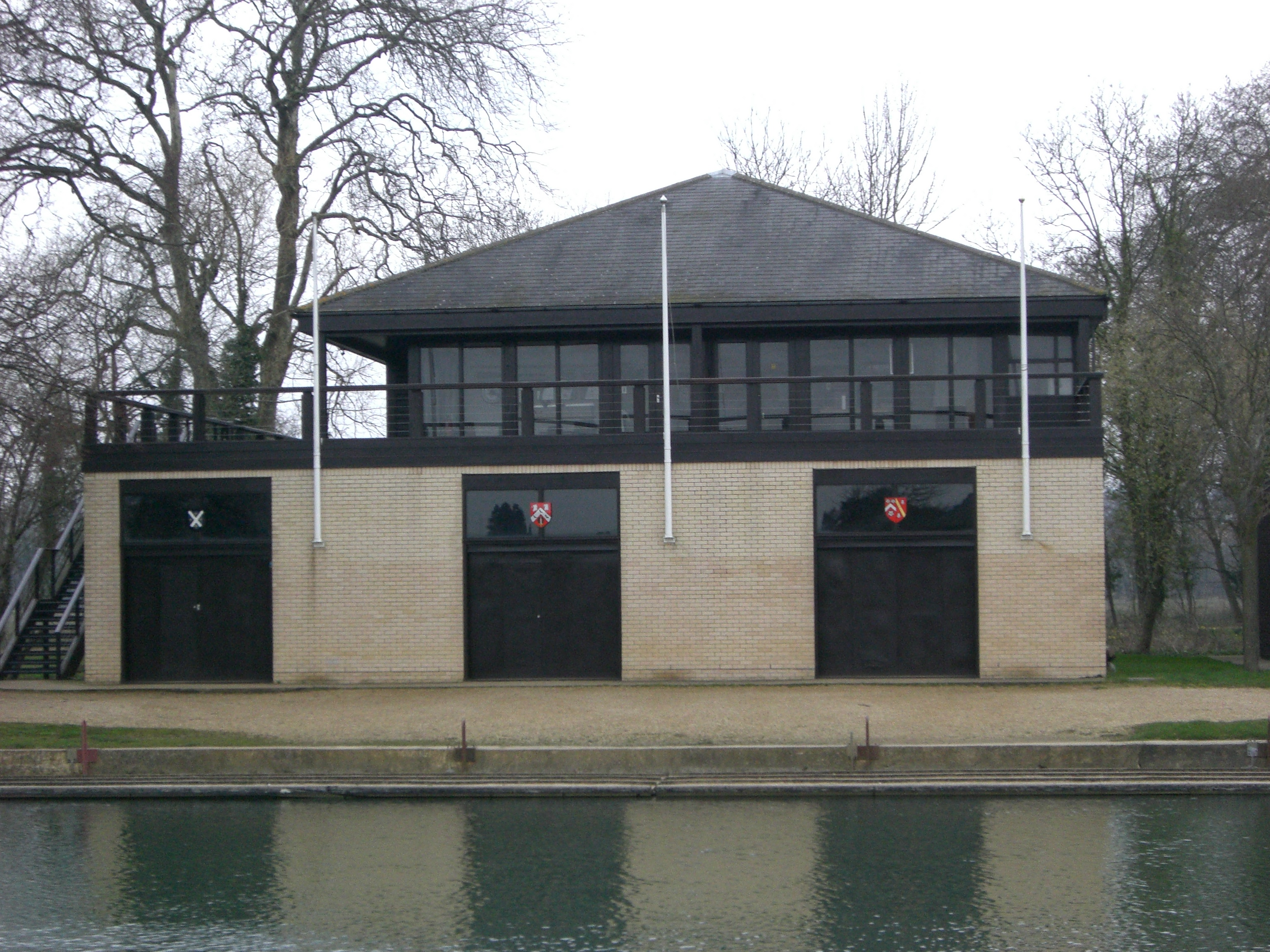
St Anne's boathouse (centre) on The Isis, shared with St Hugh's College and Wadham College

The college has teams for all major sports and competes in inter-collegiate "Cuppers" tournaments. Fixtures are either played in the neighbouring University Parks, or in the college playing fields on Woodstock Road.

St Anne's College Boat Club (SABC) organises the college's involvement in inter-college rowing events, and the college boathouse, situated on the River Isis in Christ Church Meadow is shared with St Hugh's and Wadham colleges. The college has a joint rugby team with St John's College, which won Cuppers in 2014. The women's football team, which is also joint with St John's, was victorious in Cuppers in 2020. Meanwhile, the St Anne's men's football team (known as the Mint Green Army) won the Hassan's Cup plate tournament in 2018.

== Notable people ==
=== Former members ===
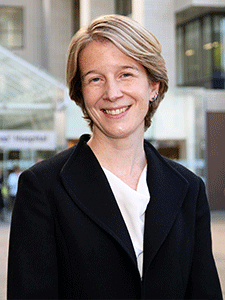
Amanda Pritchard, first woman Chief Executive of NHS England

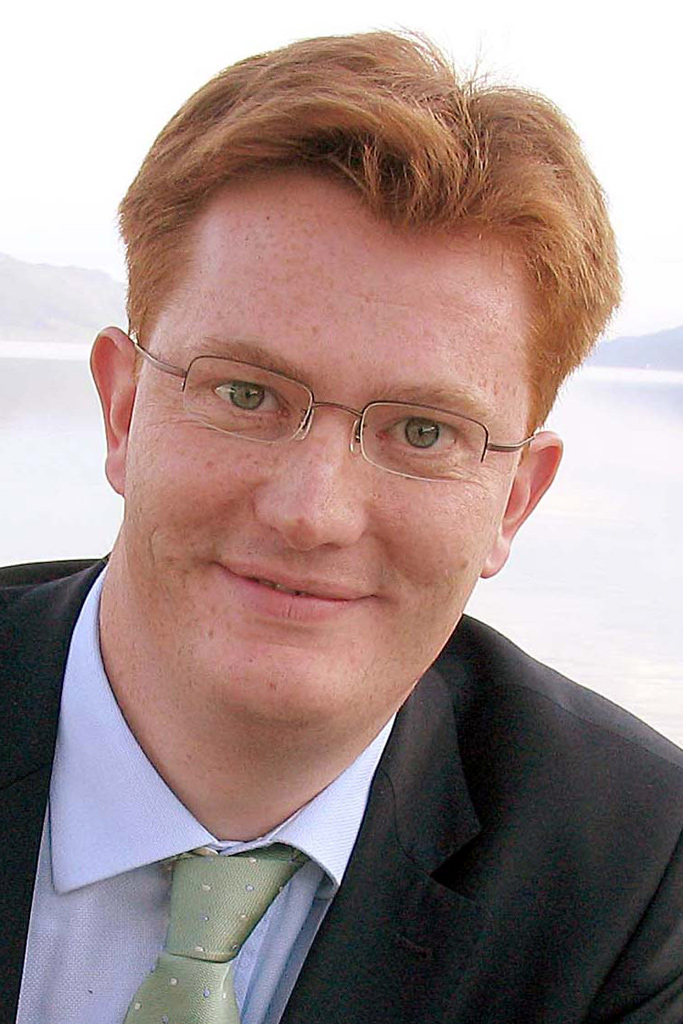
Sir Danny Alexander, former Chief Secretary to the Treasury

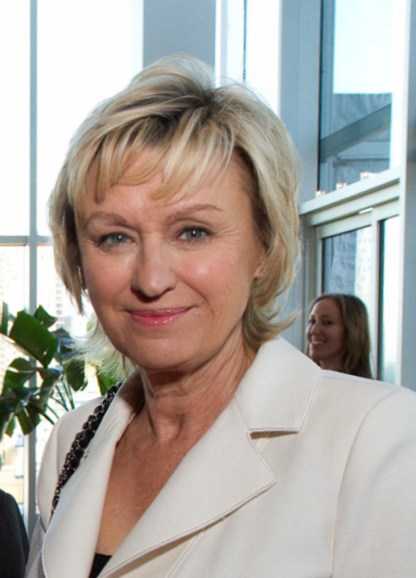
Tina Brown, editor of The Daily Beast and ex-editor of Vanity Fair and The New Yorker

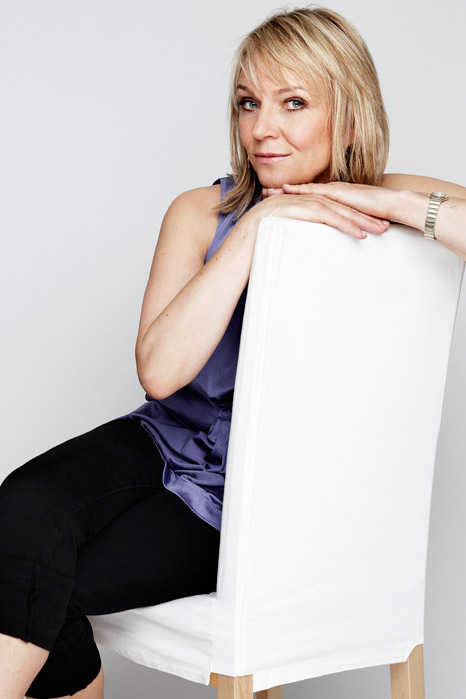
Helen Fielding, creator of Bridget Jones

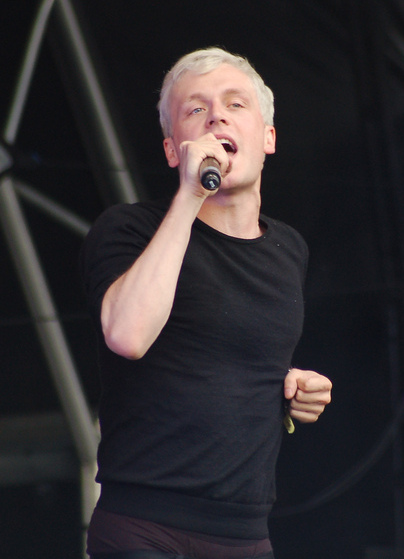
Mr Hudson, rapper and R&B artist

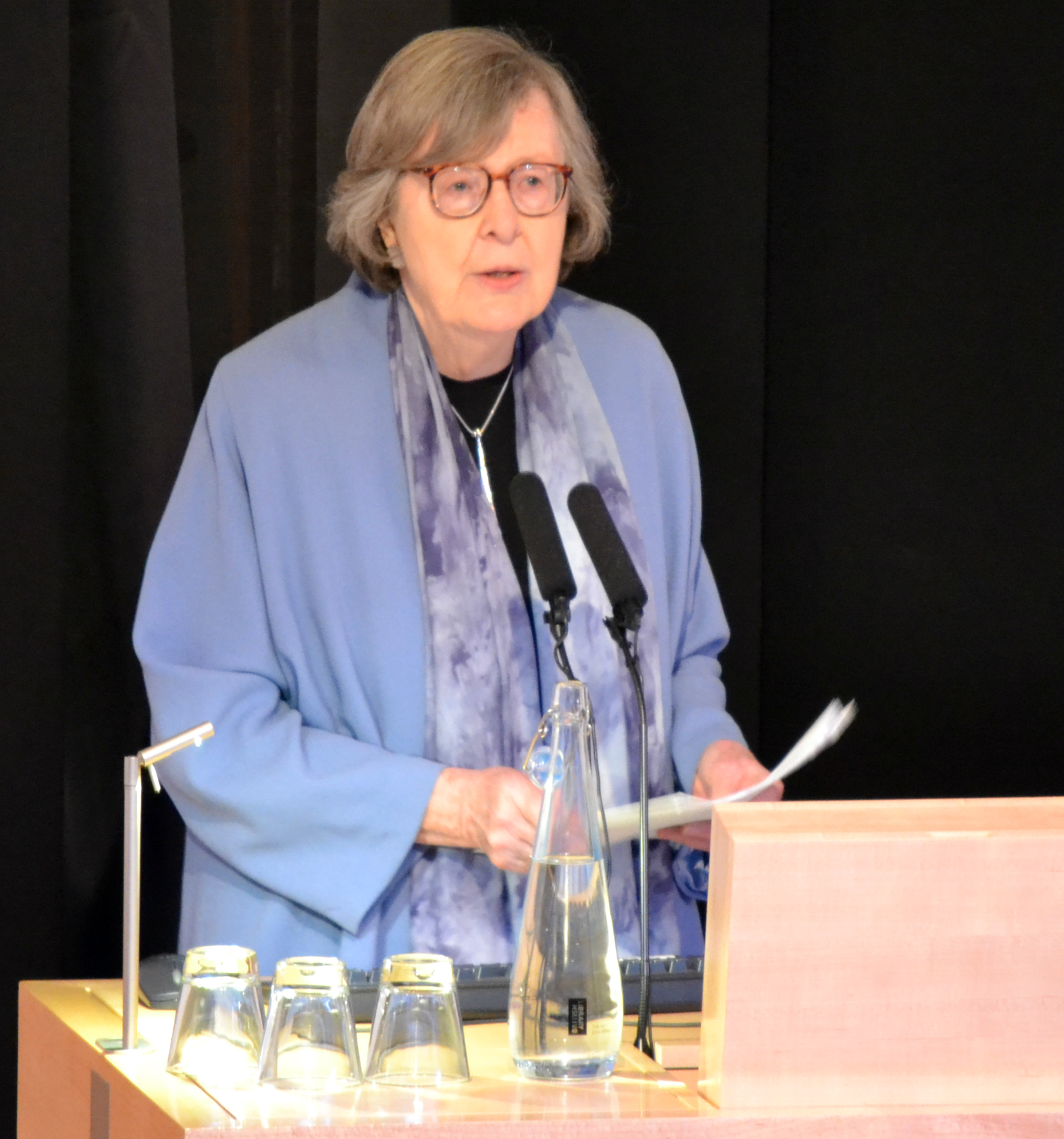
Penelope Lively, winner of the Booker Prize and Carnegie Medal

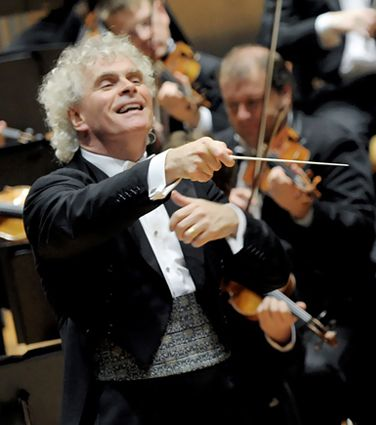
Sir Simon Rattle, principal conductor of the Berlin Philharmonic

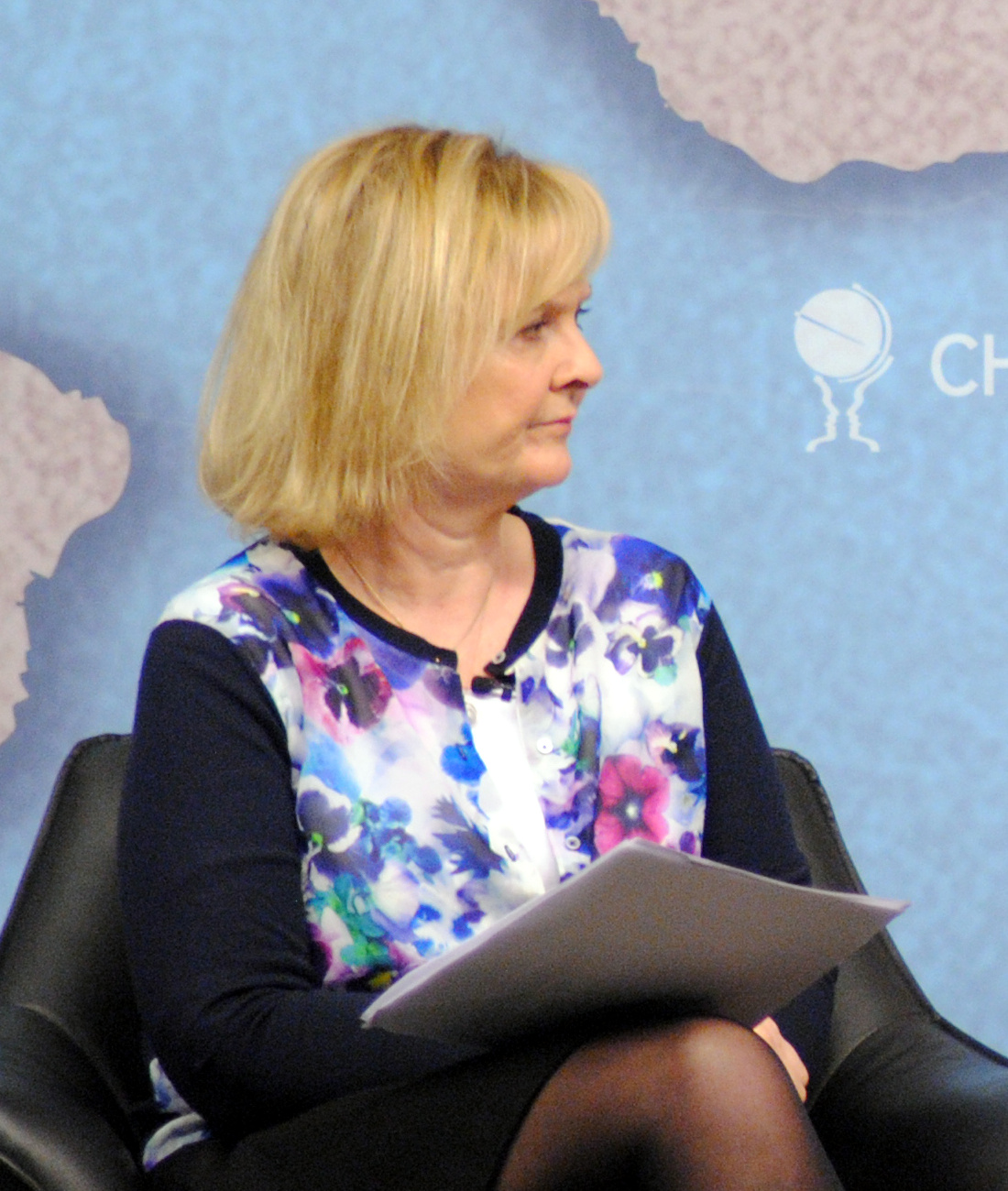
Martha Kearney, journalist and broadcaster

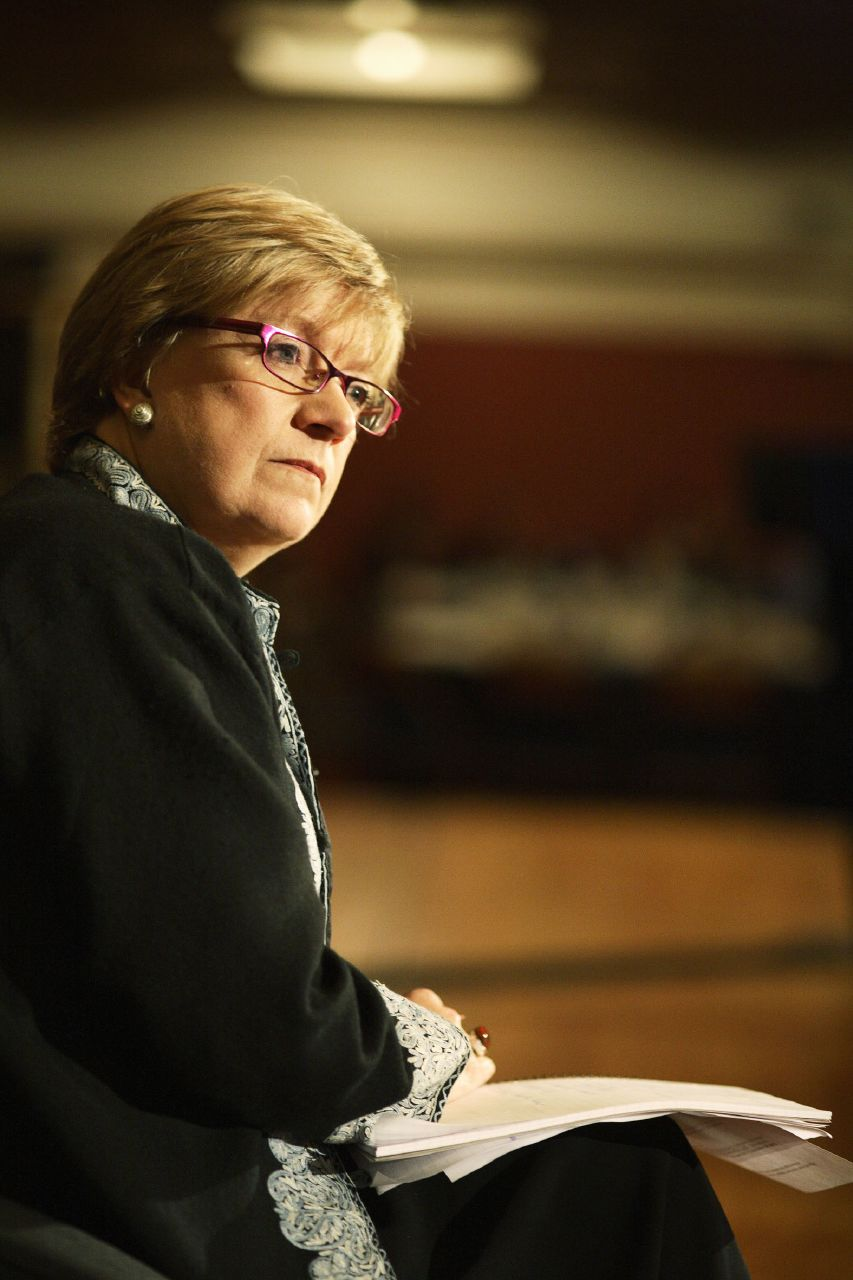
Polly Toynbee, journalist and writer

As a former women's college, St Anne's still refers to former students, female or male, as alumnae rather than alumni.

- Sir Danny Alexander (born 1972), Liberal Democrat politician
- Mary Applebey (1916–2012), mental health campaigner and co-founder of MIND
- Karen Armstrong (born 1944), author
- Tina Brown (born 1953), creator of The Daily Beast, former editor of Vanity Fair and The New Yorker
- Rosemary Cramp (born 1929), archaeologist
- Michael Dillon (1915–1962), doctor, author, poet and Buddhist monk
- Rose Dugdale (born 1941), debutante and convicted terrorist
- Helen Fielding (born 1958), novelist
- Jacob Fortune-Lloyd (born 1988), actor
- Miriam Gross (Lady Owen) (born 1938), journalist, writer and editor
- Fayza Haikal (born 1938), Egyptologist
- Devaki Jain (born 1933), Indian economist and Padma Bhushan awardee
- Diana Wynne Jones (1934–2011), author of Howl's Moving Castle
- Martha Kearney (born 1957), journalist and broadcaster
- Penelope Lively (born 1933), novelist and children's writer
- Benjamin Hudson McIldowie, (born 1979), rapper and R&B artist known by the stage name "Mr Hudson"
- Mākereti Papakura (born 1873), ethnographer
- Melanie Phillips (born 1951), journalist and author
- Sir Simon Rattle (born 1955), conductor
- Mary Remnant (1935–2020), early music specialist and performer
- John Robins (born 1982), comedian, author and radio presenter
- Polly Toynbee (born 1946), journalist and writer
- Victor Ubogu (born 1964), rugby union player
- Jill Paton Walsh (1937–2020), novelist

=== Academics ===
- William MacAskill (born 1987), philosopher and one of the originators of the effective altruism movement
- Peter Ady (1914–2004), economics
- Ruth Deech, Baroness Deech (born 1943), law
- Peter Donnelly (born 1959), mathematics
- Georg Gottlob (born 1956), computer science
- A. C. Grayling (born 1949), philosophy
- P. M. Handover (1923-1974), writer on typography
- Jenifer Hart (1914–2005), politics
- Nancy Hubbard (born 1963), business studies
- Tony Judt (1948–2010), historian
- Iris Murdoch (1919–1999), literature
- Merze Tate (1905–1996), diplomatic historian, first African-American woman student at Oxford University
- Gabriele Taylor (born 1927), philosophy

== Gallery ==
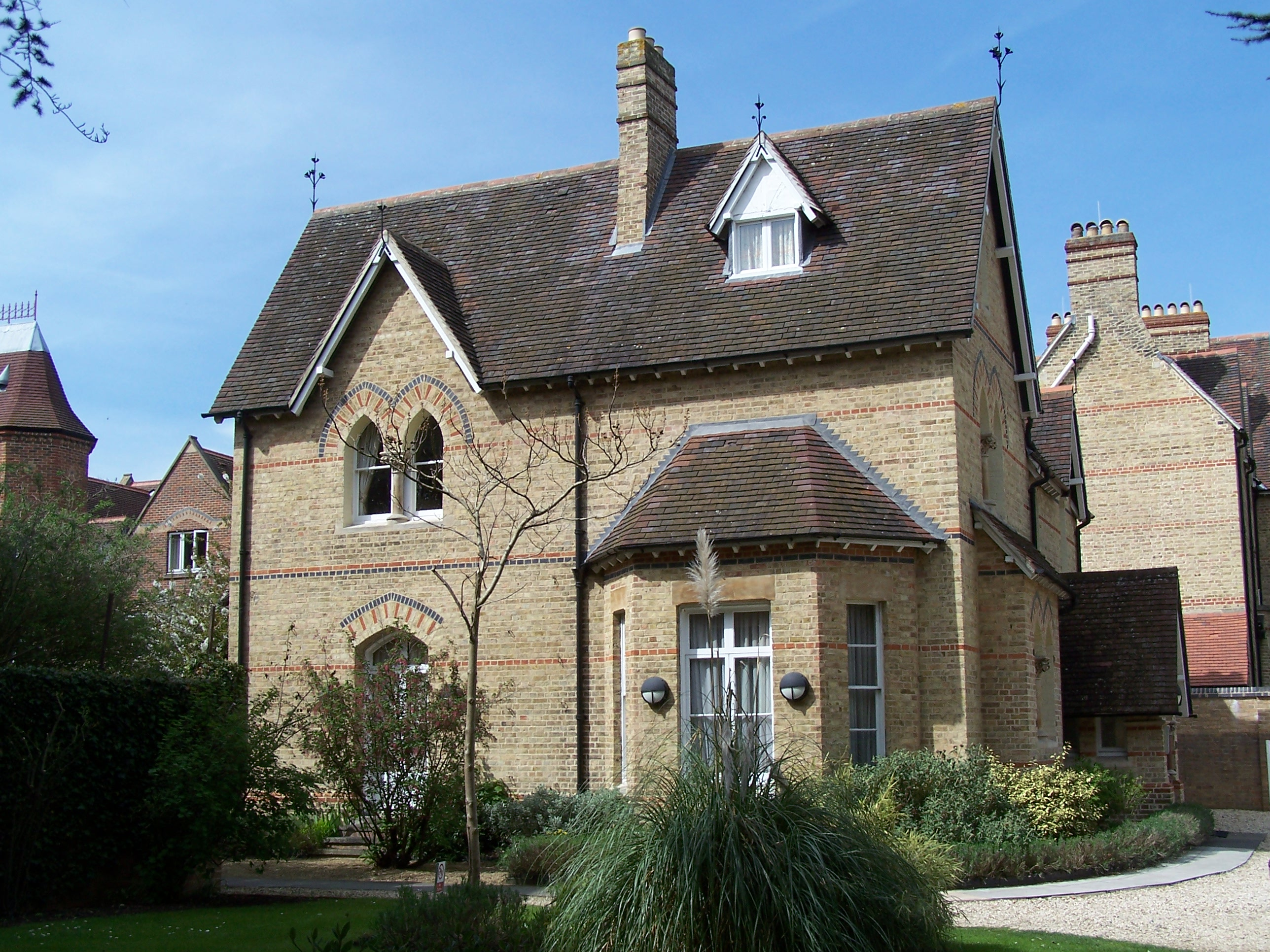
37 Banbury Road, containing offices of fellows of the college

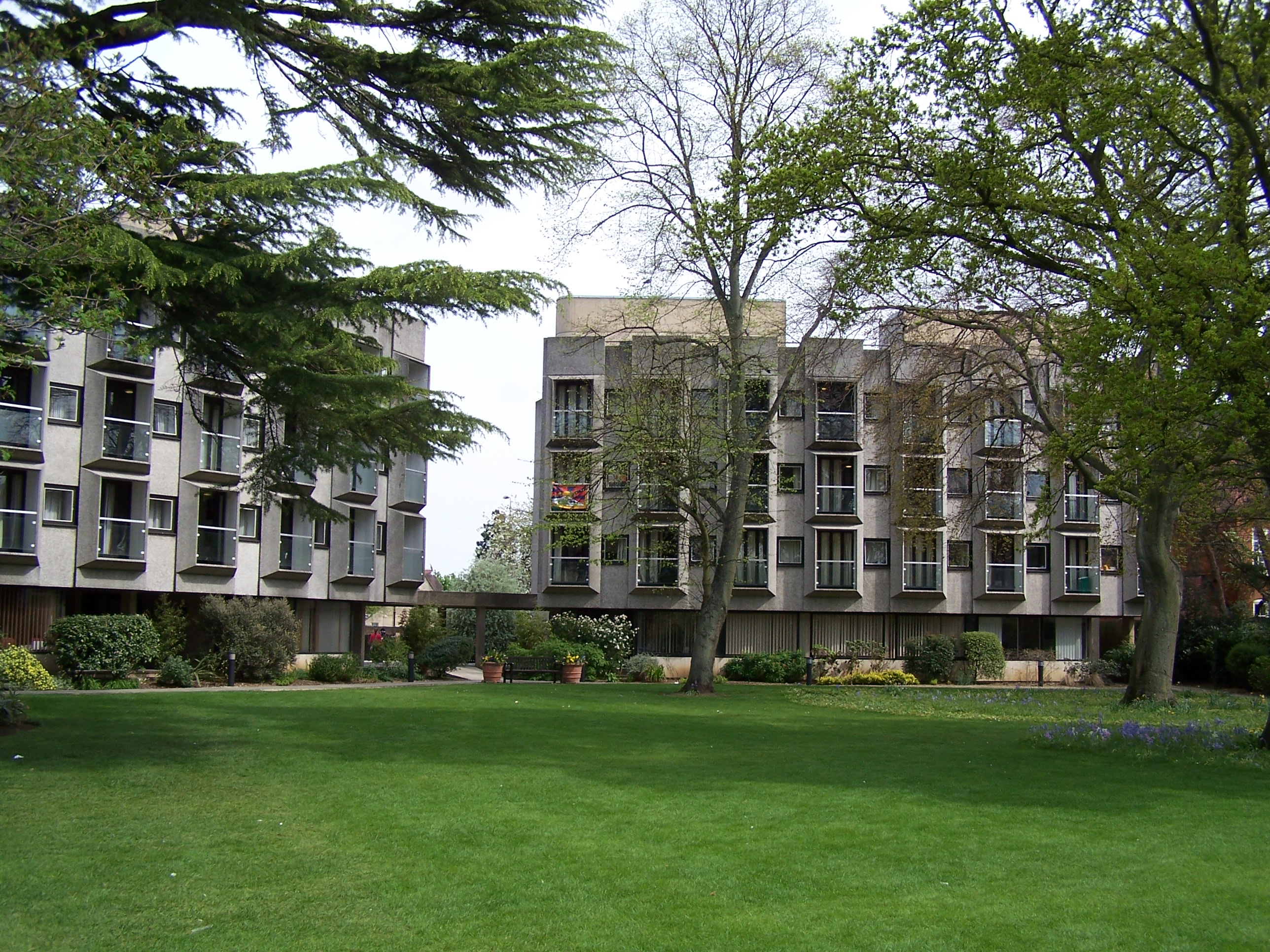
The Rayne Building viewed from the quadrangle

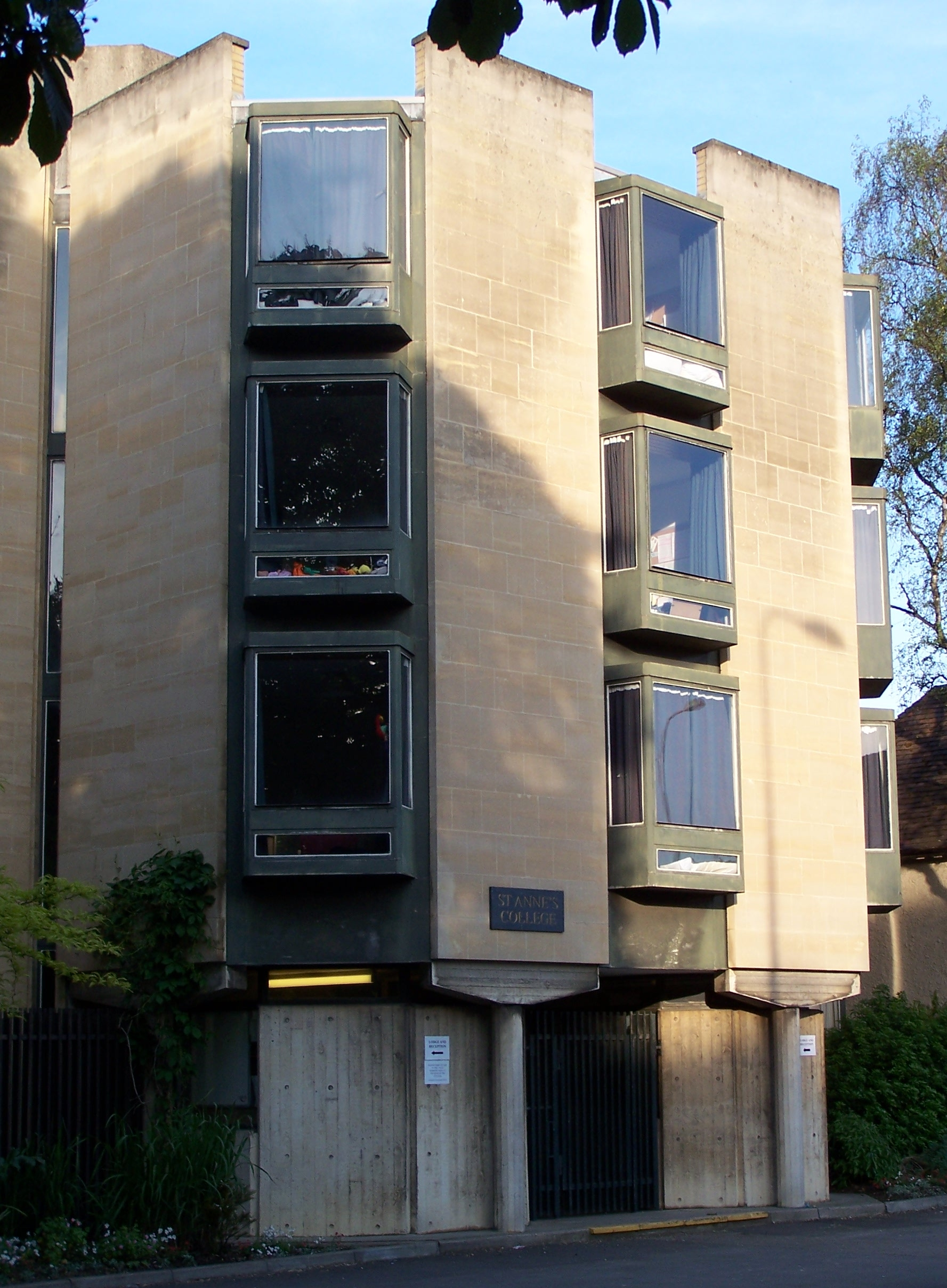
The Gatehouse, which was demolished in the 2014–15 academic year

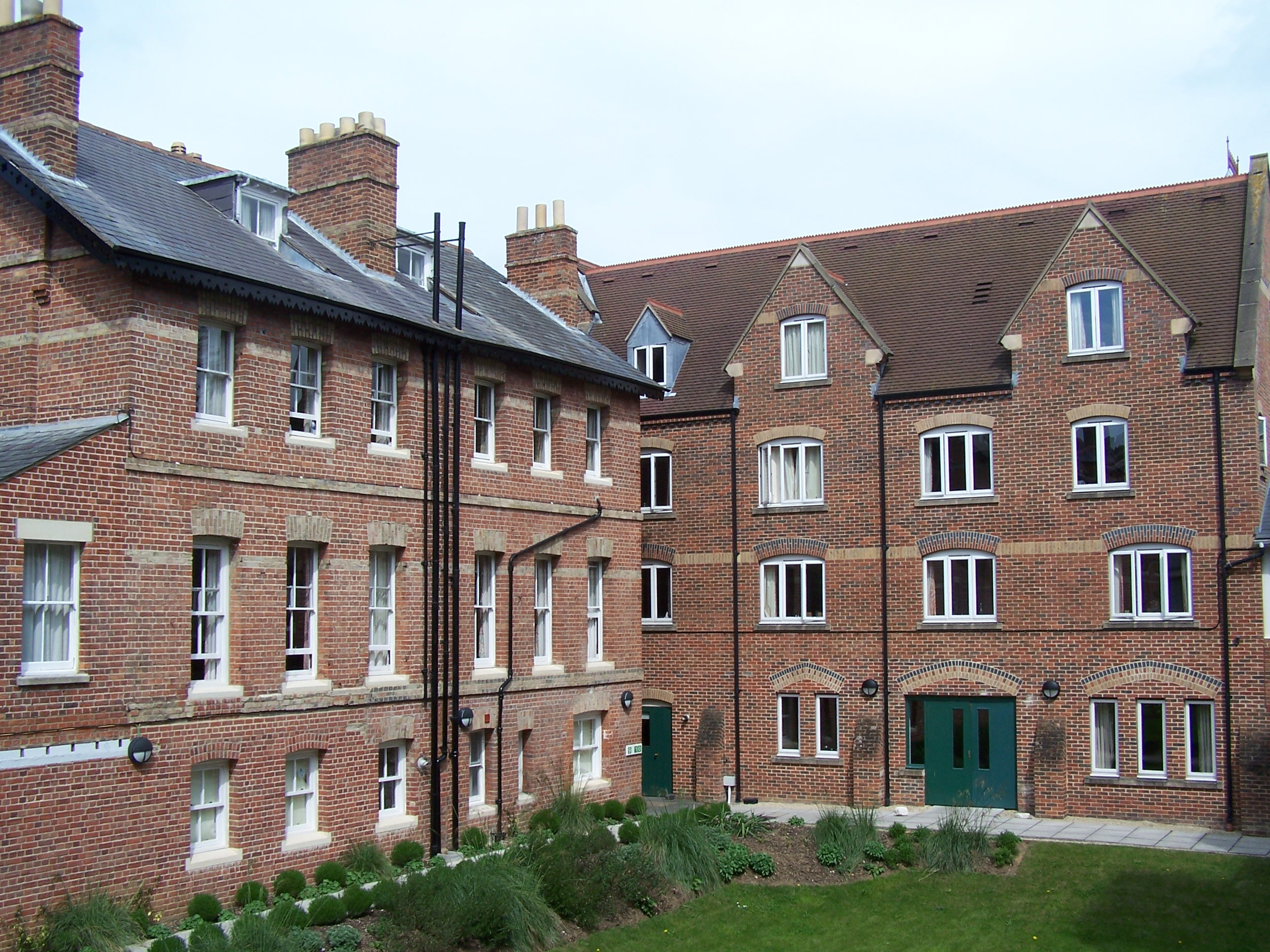
The rear of Trenaman House viewed from the Bevington Road garden

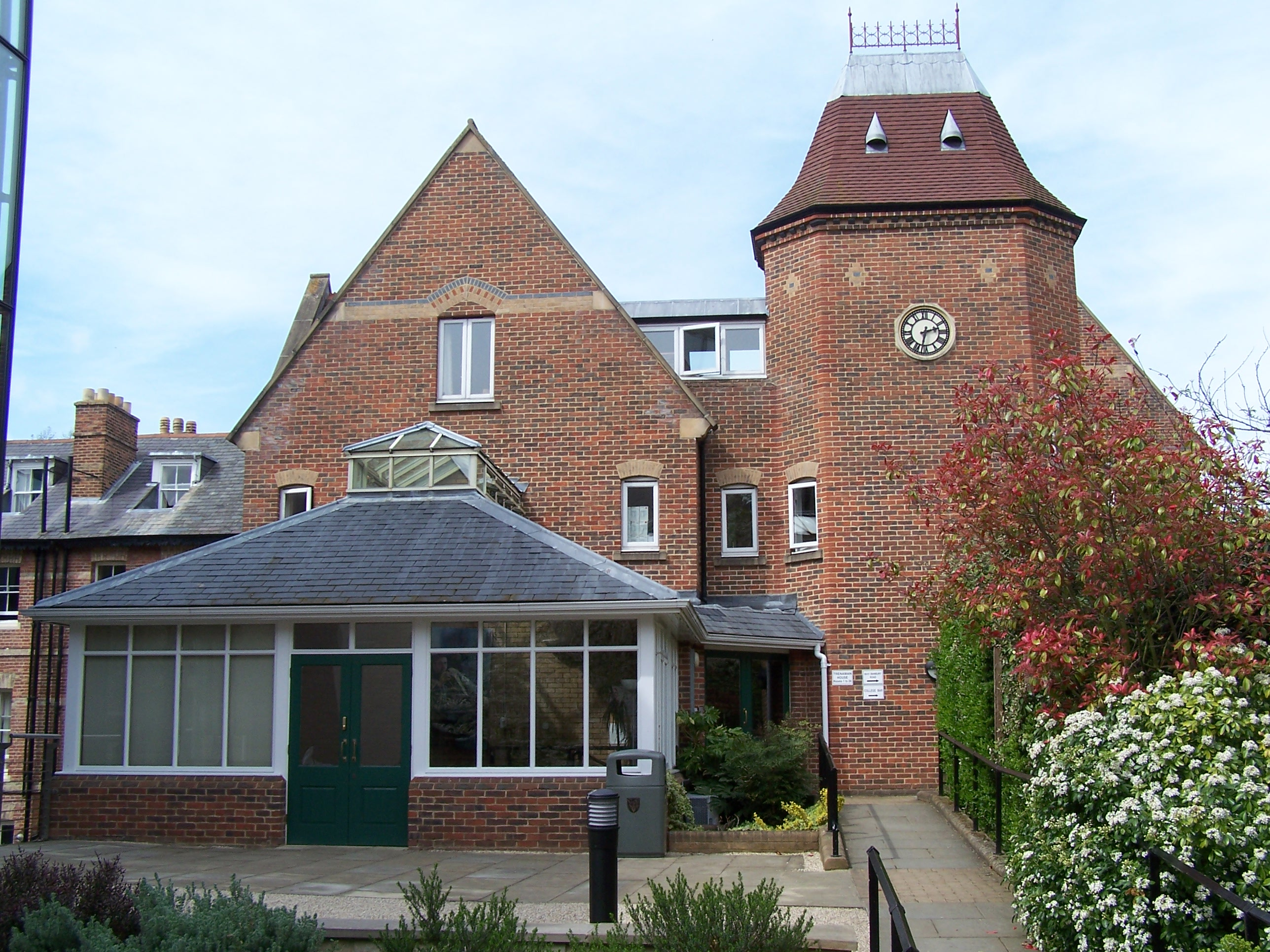
Trenaman House (Upper) containing St Anne's Coffee Shop (STACS) and some undergraduate accommodation

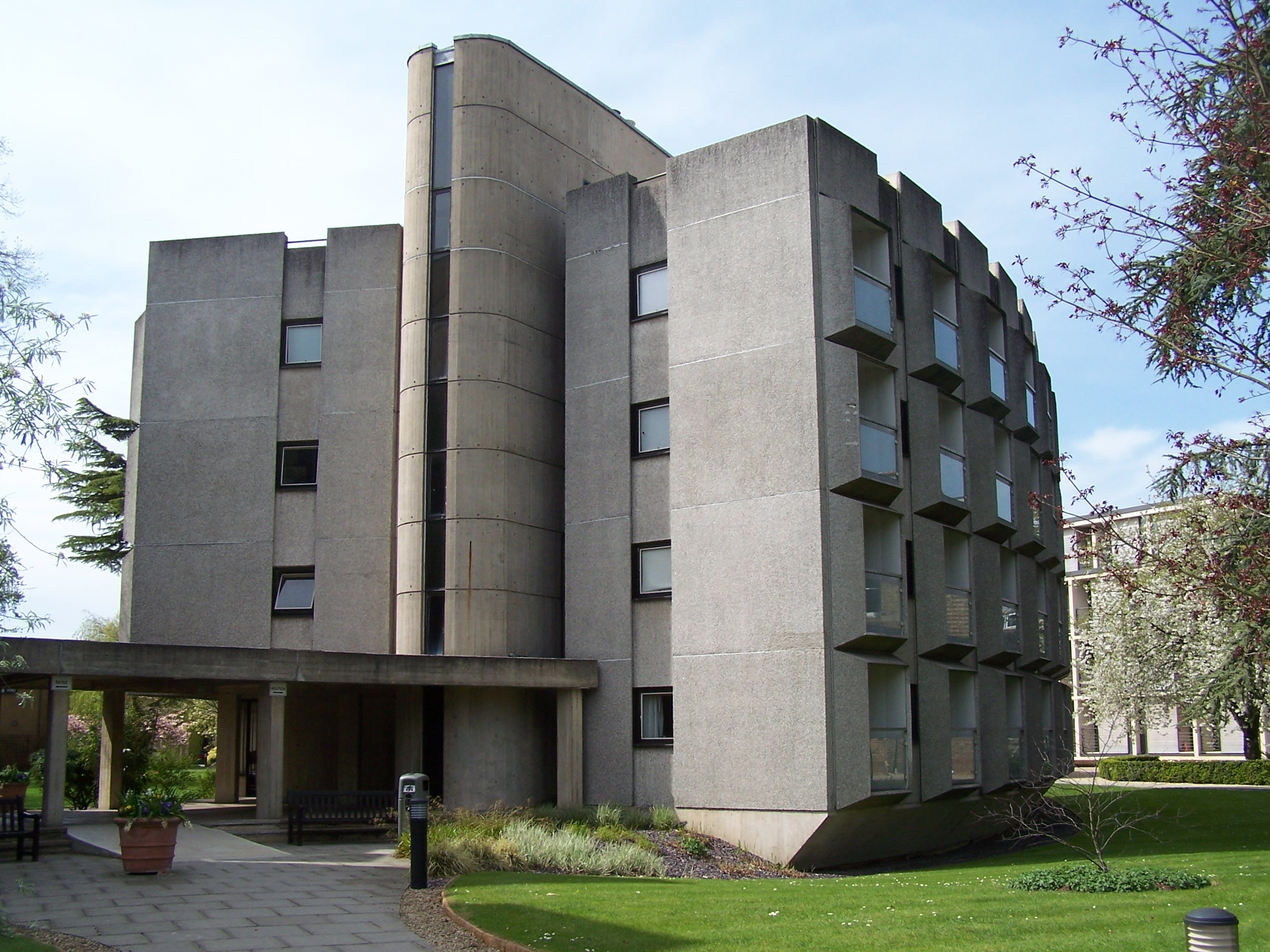
Wolfson Building

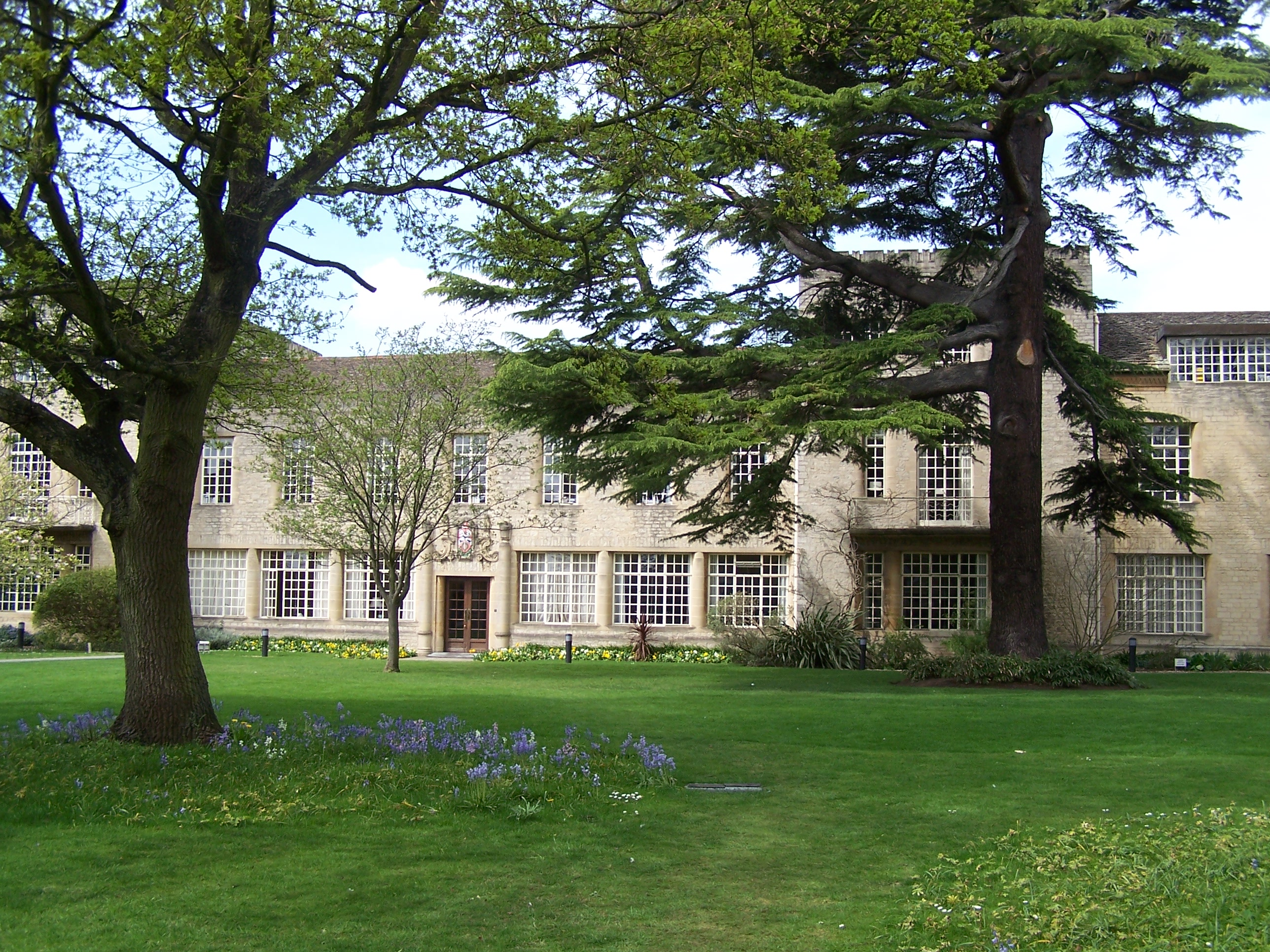
Hartland House in its parkland setting

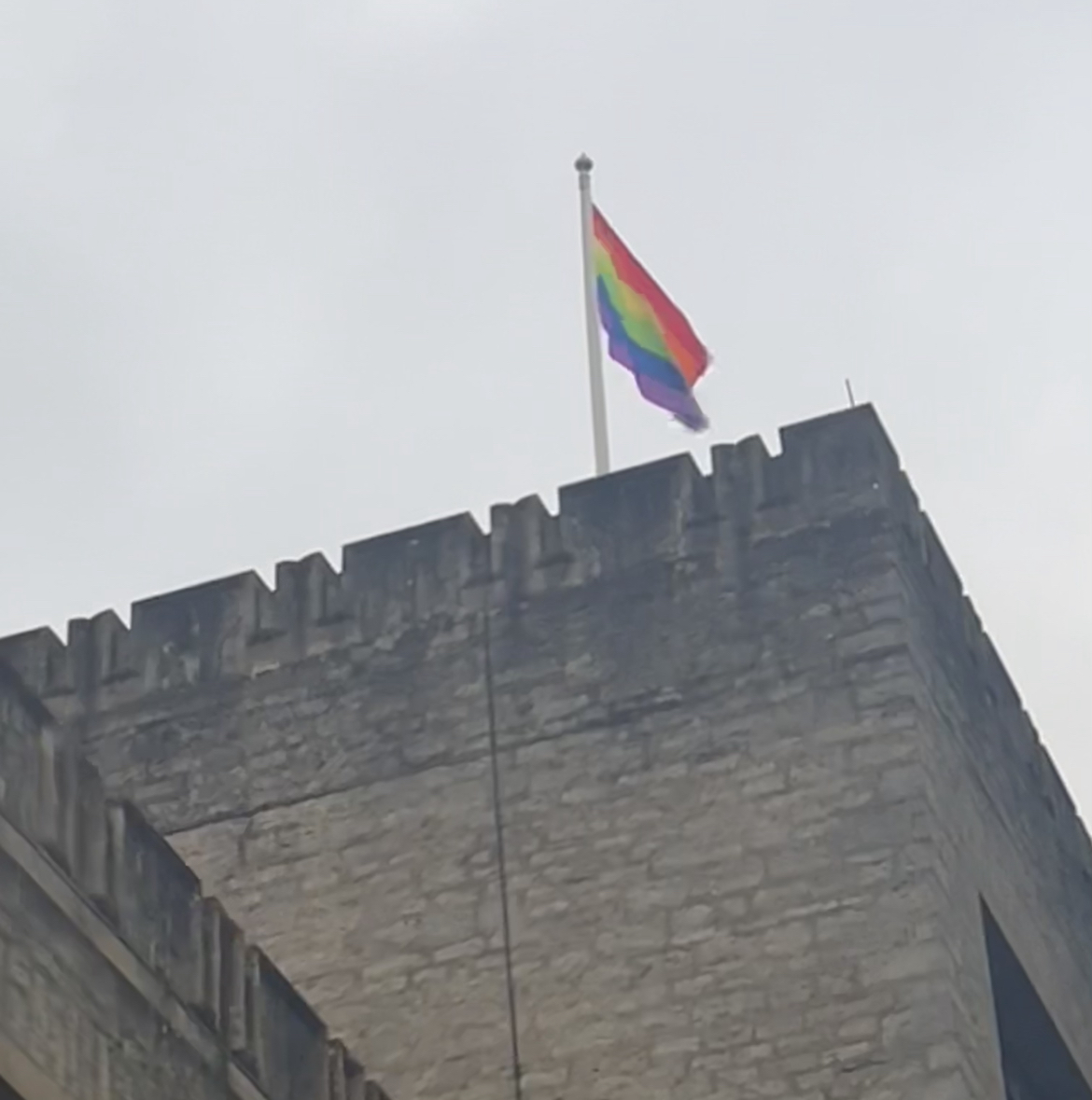
The Pride flag flying over Hartland House in 2023
