= Maurice Frankel =

Maurice Frankel OBE is director of the UK Campaign for Freedom of Information.

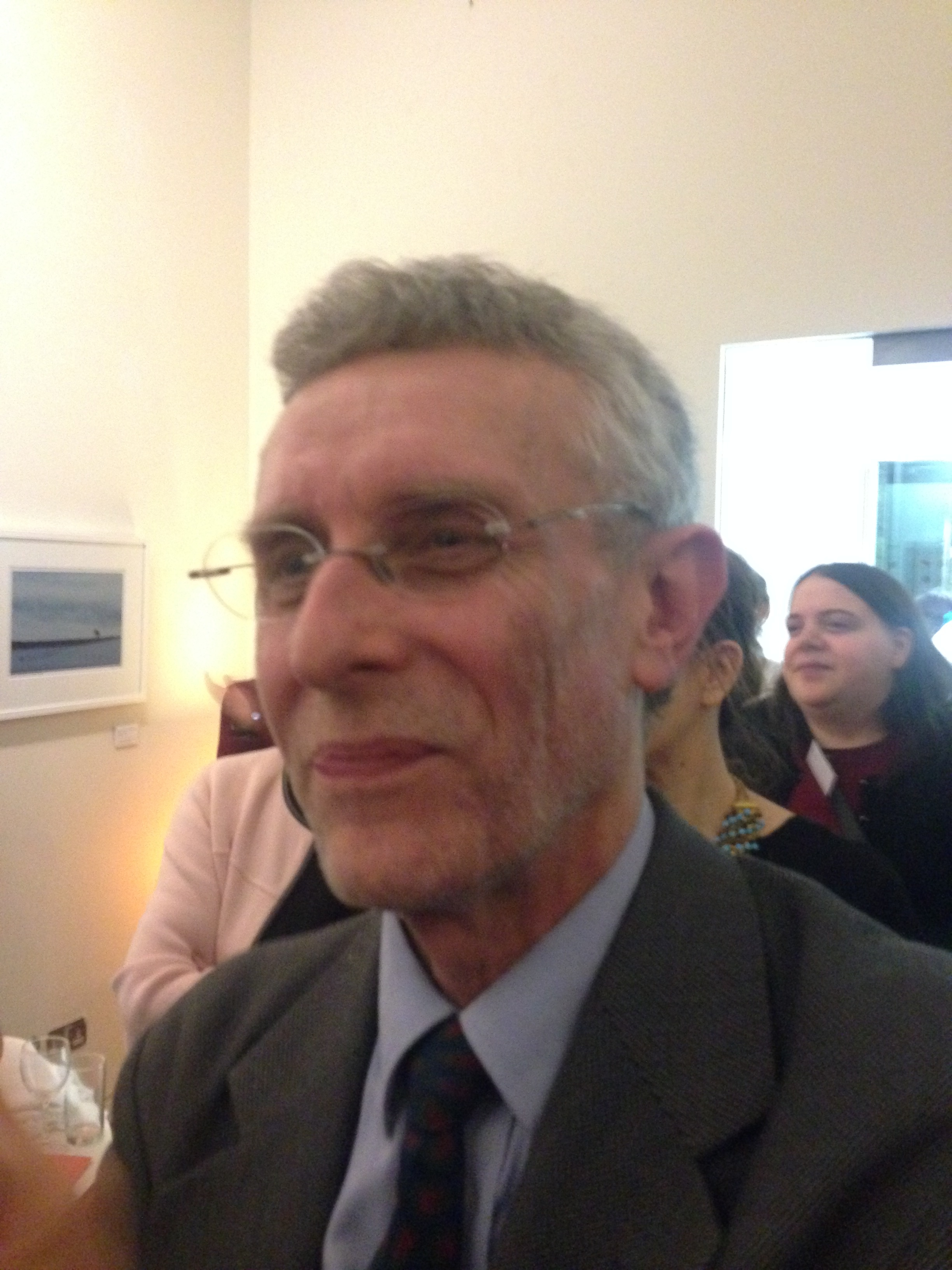
Chief Executive of the Campaign for Freedom of Information in the UK

He has worked with the Campaign for Freedom of Information since it was set up in 1984, and has been its director since 1987. He previously worked on access to environmental and safety information issues for the corporate accountability group Social Audit.

He was a member of the Lord Chancellor's Advisory Group on Implementation of the Freedom of Information Act and of the Commonwealth Group of Experts whose Freedom of Information Principles were adopted by Commonwealth Law Ministers in 1999.

He is also deputy chair of the whistleblower charity Public Concern at Work.

He is a cousin of Ruth Deech, Baroness Deech.
