= Campaign for Freedom of Information =

British advocacy group

The Campaign for Freedom of Information is an advocacy group that promotes and defends freedom of information in the UK. It seeks to strengthen the public's rights under the Freedom of Information Act 2000 and related laws and opposes attempts to weaken them. It does this through campaigning, the publication of briefings and other reports and research. The Campaign also provides advice to the public and assistance to people challenging unreasonable refusals to disclose information, and runs training courses on freedom of information.

The Campaign is a not-for-profit company, unaffiliated to any political party, (registration number 1781526) governed by a board of non-executive directors. It is funded mainly by grants from charitable foundations, donations and income from training. Maurice Frankel has been its director since 1987.

== History ==
=== 1984–1996 ===
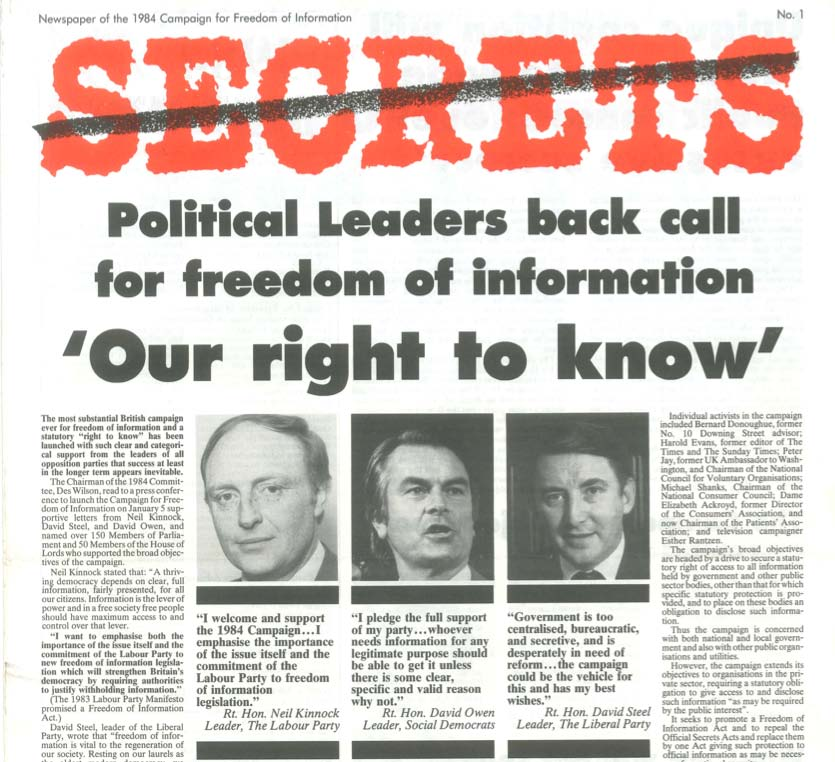
First edition of the CFOI journal Secrets

The Campaign was founded in 1984 by citizen campaigner Des Wilson to secure a freedom of information law in the UK. The organisation was officially launched on 5 January 1984 with the support of the three main opposition party leaders of the time and 150 MPs from all parties. The Prime Minister, Margaret Thatcher, opposed FOI in principle, saying that a legal power to force ministers to disclose information would weaken ministers' accountability to Parliament.

They worked to keep FOI on the political agenda until the climate became more favourable, while seeking to introduce specific rights to information through private members' bills. Several private members' bills that the Campaign drafted and promoted reached the statute book as the:

- Access to Personal Files Act 1987 (access to individuals' housing and social work files)
- Access to Medical Reports Act 1988 (access to medical reports provided to employers or insurers)
- Environment and Safety Information Act 1988 (access to specified enforcement notices)
- Access to Health Records Act 1990 (a general right of access to health records)

The Campaign also drafted a bill to reform section 2 of the Official Secrets Act 1911, a catch-all provision which made the unauthorised disclosure of any official information a criminal offence. The Protection of Official Information Bill, introduced by MP Richard Shepherd in 1988, would have replaced section 2 with a narrower measure that included a public interest defence. The bill was defeated after the government imposed an unprecedented three-line whip on its own MPs at second reading requiring them to vote it down. Thatcher's Conservative government later introduced the Official Secrets Act 1989, which repealed section 2 of the 1911 Act, but rejected all efforts to insert a public interest defence.

In February 1993, another of the Campaign's private members' bills for a full FOI Act, the Right to Know Bill, was introduced by MP Mark Fisher and debated for a total of 21 hours in the Commons.

With the whistleblowing charity Public Concern at Work the Campaign drafted the Whistleblower Protection Bill, introduced as a ten-minute rule bill by MP Tony Wright early in 1995. A revised version, the Public Interest Disclosure Bill, was introduced by MP Don Touhig at the end of 1995. The bill completed its committee stage in the Commons before being talked out by the government in 1996. Shortly after the Labour Party won the 1997 general election, MP Richard Shepherd drew a high place in the private members' ballot and introduced the Public Interest Disclosure Bill, which received Royal Assent in July 1998.

=== 1996–2005 ===
In 1996, Tony Blair presented the Campaign's annual awards, and strongly committed himself to FOI. Following Labour's election in 1997, the Campaign's chairman James Cornford was appointed a special adviser by David Clark, the cabinet minister responsible for drawing up the government's FOI proposals. However, after a well-received white paper, Your Right to Know (CM 3818), Clark was relieved of this role and responsibility for FOI was moved to the Home Office under Jack Straw. The Home Office later published a draft FOI bill that was greeted with "universal hostility".

The Campaign took the lead in proposing amendments to the bill during its Parliamentary passage. It played a similar role in relation to the Freedom of Information (Scotland) Act, which received Royal Assent in 2002.

The Campaign's role in bringing about FOI was acknowledged by Straw, who as Home Secretary introduced the legislation. Straw told MPs on the Justice Committee, which was conducting post-legislative scrutiny of the FOI Act, that Labour's manifesto commitment "was the product of a brilliant campaign by the Campaign for Freedom of Information". The commentator Peter Riddell wrote that the Campaign "was primarily responsible for the introduction of the legislation".

=== 2005 onwards ===
Since 2005 the Campaign has worked to defend the FOI Act from repeated attempts to weaken it. These started in 2006, when the government published draft regulations to make it easier for public authorities to refuse FOI requests on cost grounds. This was followed by separate moves to remove Parliament and then MPs' expenses from the legislation. There was also pressure to exclude cabinet papers from access, exclude all policy discussions and to introduce charges for requests. The Campaign has opposed all these so far unsuccessful initiatives – though in 2010 a measure giving the Royal Family greater protection from FOI was passed.

The Campaign continues to press for improvements to the FOI Act. In particular to:

- ensure that FOI applies to contractors providing public services
- introduce tighter time limits for responding to requests and for them to be enforced more effectively
- extend the Act's public interest test to the 'absolute' exemptions
- allow requesters to specify that they want access to actual copies of documents not just the information in them
- extend the 6 month time limit within which the Information Commissioner can prosecute authorities which deliberately destroy requested records – the Government agreed to this change in 2012, but it has not yet been implemented.

Examples raised by the Campaign of contracting situations which fall outside the scope of FOI legislation were referred to by John Hemming MP when he introduced a proposed amendment to the FOI Act covering public authorities' contractors and sub-contractors in 2014. He referred to the enquiries about parking tickets issued, and then cancelled on appeal, by traffic wardens employed by a council contractor and who were offered incentives to issue tickets, the qualifications of assessors who were employed by a contractor to verify that incapacity benefit claims have been properly administered, and the cost of providing television and telephone connections for prisoners in a privately managed prison. Hemming echoed Frankel's view that every outsourcing contract "reduces the public's access to information because of [this] loophole in the FOI Act".

== Support work ==
The Campaign provides advice to the public about their rights to information and has published a short guide to the Freedom of Information Act and related laws. It assists individuals who have been refused information to complain to the Information Commissioner or appeal against Information Commissioner decisions to the Information Rights Tribunal. It has been instrumental in a number of successful Tribunal appeals involving the police's failure to provide information to a murder victim's family, relatives denied information about a hospital death, toxic land contamination, the withholding of an MP's policy correspondence on the spurious grounds that disclosure would breach his privacy, and in overturning a decision that would have introduced an entirely new layer of secrecy about Ombudsman inquiries. It has assisted a requester bring a judicial review of a ministerial veto blocking the release of a report on the HS2 rail link.

The organisation recently intervened in two Supreme Court cases, with the Media Legal Defence Initiative in support of The Times newspaper's ultimately unsuccessful argument that Article 10 of the ECHR incorporates a right to FOI and in support of The Guardian's challenge to the government's use of the ministerial veto in the FOI Act to block the disclosure of the then Prince Charles' advocacy correspondence, the so-called Black spider memos, with government departments.

The Campaign provides training on how to use FOI. It also provides a regular training course for FOI officers on recent developments in FOI case law.

== 30th anniversary ==
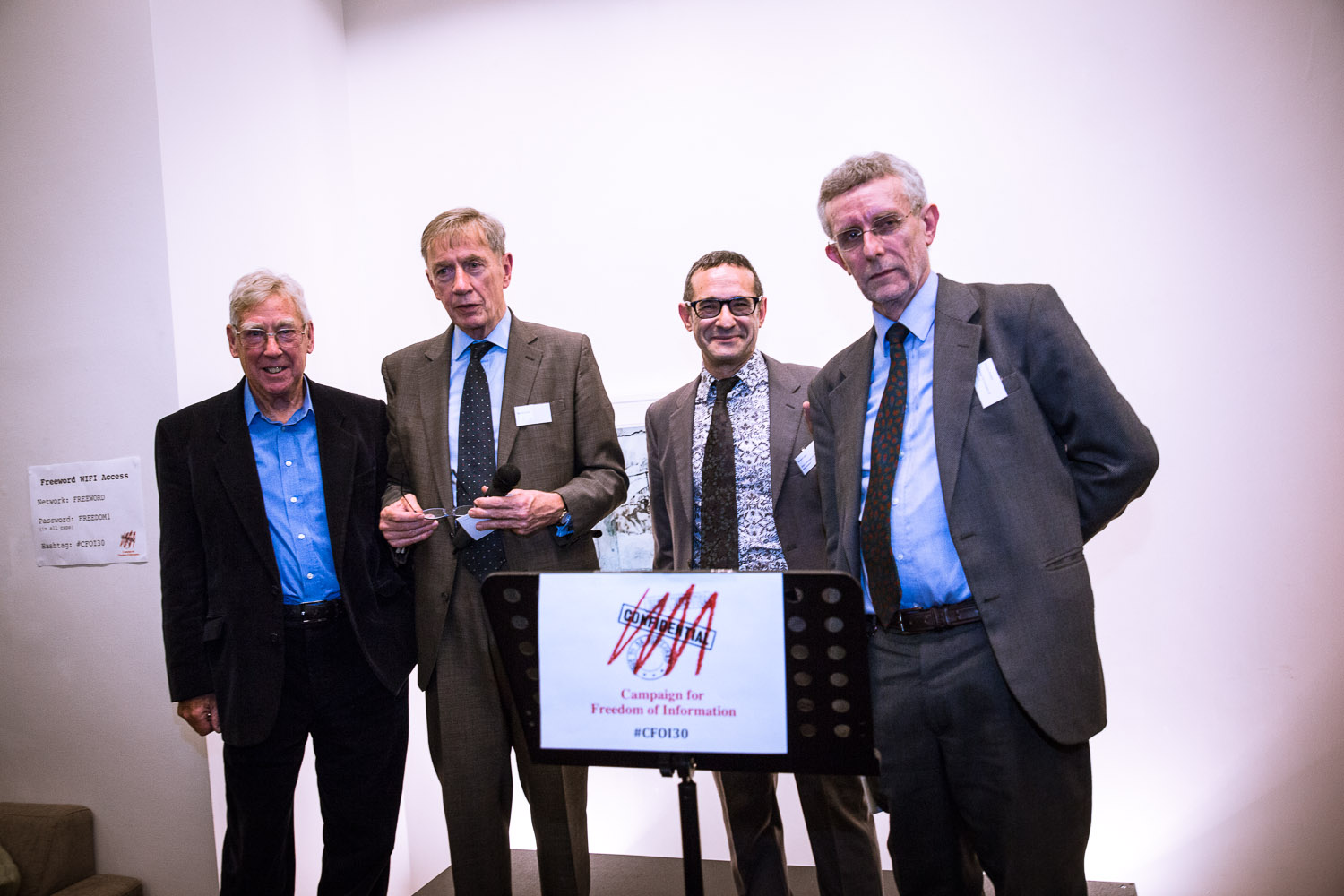
30th anniversary featuring from left to right: Des Wilson (founder), Neil McIntosh (chair until 2014), Russell Levy (chair) and Maurice Frankel (director).

In January 2015, the Campaign celebrated its 30th anniversary with an event hosted by ARTICLE 19 at the Free Word Centre at which Ian Hislop and Des Wilson spoke. It marked the occasion by selling special edition T-shirts featuring Tony Blair (who has described the introduction of FOI as one of his biggest mistakes) in a cartoon designed for it by political cartoonist Steve Bell.

== In fiction ==
The character Sir Arnold Robinson from the hit series Yes Minister accepts the chairmanship of the campaign for freedom of information, and in Yes, Prime Minister is regularly seen in this role, more often than not using it to aid Sir Humphrey in leaking material that will damage the government (once he has the assurance that the leaked information is inaccurate).
