= Heather Brooke =

British-American journalist

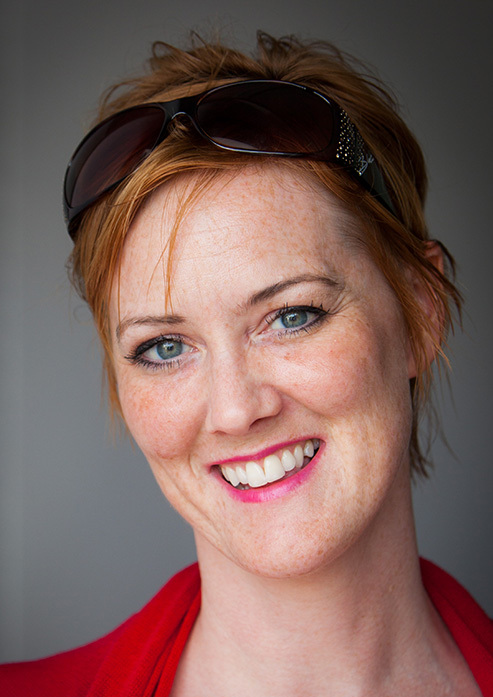
- Heather Brooke in 2012.
- Born: Heather Rose Brooke; 15 December 1970 (age 55); Pennsylvania, U.S.
- Education: University of Washington (BA); University of Warwick (MA); City St George's, University of London (PhD)
- Occupations: Journalist, writer
- Known for: Role in exposing the 2009 British MP expenses scandal
- Website: heatherbrooke.org

Heather Rose Brooke (born 1970) is a British-American journalist and freedom of information campaigner. Resident since the 1990s in the UK, she helped to expose the 2009 expenses scandal, which culminated in the resignation of Speaker of the House of Commons Michael Martin, dozens of MPs standing down in the 2010 general election and multiple MPs being jailed.

Brooke was a professor of journalism at City University London's Department of Journalism and an adjunct professor at Columbia Journalism School in New York. She is the author of Your Right to Know (2006), The Silent State (2010), and The Revolution Will Be Digitised (2011), as well as a regularly updated Substack.

== Early life ==
=== Education ===
Brooke was born in Pennsylvania in the United States to parents originally from Liverpool, England, and has dual United States/United Kingdom citizenship. She grew up in Seattle, Washington, where her mother worked for Boeing and graduated from Federal Way High School.

According to The Scotsman, she briefly moved to England as a teenager, but returned to the United States when she was 15. She attended the University of Washington Department of Communication, where she graduated in 1992 with a double major degree in journalism and political science. While there, she wrote for the student newspaper, The Daily, covering news stories and acting as the paper's sex columnist, writing with what she called a "feminist" slant.

=== Early career ===
An internship with The Spokesman-Review in Olympia, Washington to cover the state legislature gave her an early exposure to using public records requests to investigate the expenses of politicians, although she found little beyond taking advantage of frequent flyer miles. After graduation, she worked for a year at the Spokesman-Review, but it lacked the funds to keep her on longer. She then became a crime reporter for the Spartanburg Herald-Journal, where she reported on murder cases and uncovered flaws in South Carolina's forensic crime lab.

Describing herself as "burnt out" from covering over 300 murders, Brooke took a break from journalism. When her mother died in a car accident in 1996, and her father moved back to England, she no longer had family in America and decided to relocate to the United Kingdom. She enrolled for a master's in English literature at the University of Warwick, then moved to East London with her husband, where she took a job with the BBC as a copywriter. Boyd Tonkin wrote in 2010 that when she arrived in the UK she was immediately introduced to the "British disease": "the overweening haughtiness of bureaucratic jobsworths, and the deference of citizens." She became a neighbourhood activist, describing local public officials as having a surprisingly hostile attitude compared to local governments in the United States.

== Freedom of Information writing and activism ==
With the enactment of the Freedom of Information Act 2000, Brooke began work on a book explaining how to use the law, which was not scheduled to come into effect for another five years. Originally titled Your Right to Know: How to Use the Freedom of Information Act and Other Access Laws, the book was reissued in October 2004 as Your Right to Know: A Citizen's Guide to Freedom of Information, with a foreword by Alan Rusbridger, editor of The Guardian. In October 2006 it was revised and published in paperback and hardcover editions that included a foreword by satirist Ian Hislop.

=== BBC minutes ===
In early 2007, Brooke won a landmark legal case that led the BBC to disclose the minutes of its Board of Governors' meeting of 28 January 2004. At that meeting, the governors had decided to dismiss director general Greg Dyke and issue an apology to the government in response to the Hutton Inquiry. Brooke, along with journalists from The Guardian, had requested the minutes shortly after the Freedom of Information Act came into force, but the BBC resisted disclosure for nearly two years. In December 2006, the case came before the Information Tribunal, which the following month ruled that the BBC should disclose the minutes.

=== MPs expenses ===
In October 2004, Brooke started to request details of MPs' expenses, via the House of Commons Freedom of Information Officer, Bob Castle. However, the information was in a bulk format, and could not be broken down to individual MPs.

In January 2005, the Freedom of Information Act 2000 came into force, allowing members of the public to request disclosure of information from public bodies. She started out requesting all 646 MPs' expenses, but the Commons claimed that would be too costly. She then asked for request for travel information (refused); then for the names and salaries of MPs' staff, blocked personally by the Speaker of the House of Commons Michael Martin. She then asked for information on second homes for the details for all MPs, but this was also refused.

In 2006, Brooke reduced her request to 10 MPs—the leaders of the parties and a few ministers. After again being refused, in July 2006 she made an appeal to the Information Commissioner, Richard Thomas. Her request was considered for a year, together with two other similar requests on MPs' expenses which had been appealed to the Commissioner in 2005, from Jonathan Ungoed-Thomas of The Sunday Times. The Information Commissioner ordered the release of some information on 15 June 2007. House of Commons authorities objected to this order in June 2007 and MPs had, in May 2007, voted in favour of the Freedom of Information (Amendment) Bill which sought to exempt MPs from the 2000 act. The amendment bill was ultimately withdrawn prior to second reading in the House of Lords because peers were unwilling to sponsor the bill.

In February 2008, after referral to an Information Tribunal, it was ruled that Commons authorities had to release information on 14 MPs. The Speaker appealed against the decision on behalf of the House of Commons, challenging the requests for publication of expenses for 11 serving MPs: Gordon Brown, David Cameron, John Prescott, Menzies Campbell, Margaret Beckett, George Osborne, William Hague, Mark Oaten, George Galloway, Barbara Follett and Ann Keen; and three former MPs: Tony Blair, Peter Mandelson and John Wilkinson. The appeal was heard at the High Court of Justice, which ruled on 16 May 2008 in favour of releasing the information:

The House of Commons expense system has a shortfall—both in terms of transparency and accountability. We have no doubt that the public interest is at stake. We are not here dealing with idle gossip, or public curiosity about what in truth are trivialities. The expenditure of public money through the payment of MPs' salaries and allowances is a matter of direct and reasonable interest to taxpayers.

No appeal was lodged against the High Court ruling, and the details were made public on 23 May 2008. In January 2009, the Leader of the House of Commons, Harriet Harman, tabled a motion to exempt MPs' expenses from being disclosed under a Freedom of Information request. Labour MPs were placed under a three line whip to force the motion through the Commons. However, opposition parties stated they would vote against the proposals, and large scale public opposition emerged. The proposals were ultimately dropped on 21 January 2009. The Commons authorities announced that full disclosure of all MPs' expenses would be published on 1 July 2009, following the 2009 European Elections in early June 2009.

In May 2009, The Daily Telegraph obtained unedited details of all MPs' expenses, including address details which showed the practice of "flipping", that is, changing the registered main address for various tax and expense purposes. The disclosures led to several MPs' resignations and a national scandal.

=== Aftermath and recognition ===
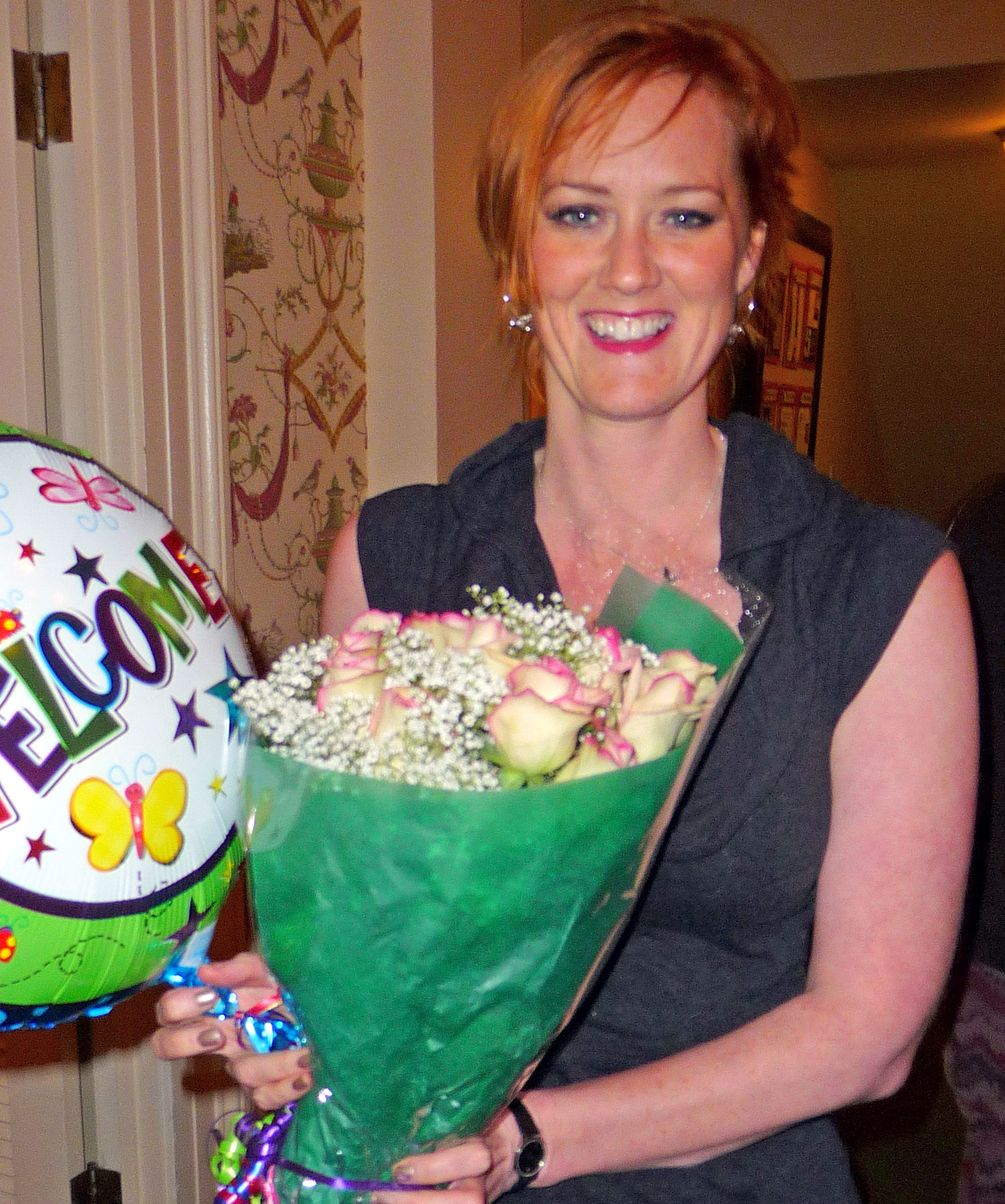
Heather Brooke in 2010 welcomed home to Washington State for her "Key Award"

On 23 February 2010 BBC Four showed a dramatised account about Heather Brooke's campaign for disclosure of MPs' expenses, titled On Expenses. The role of Heather Brooke was played by Anna Maxwell Martin. Brooke still serves as a visiting professor in the journalism department of City University London and has done since the expenses scandal. She was the first international winner of the FOI award in 2009 at the Investigative Reporters and Editors Awards. In March 2010 she was awarded the Judges' Prize in the British Press Awards, and the Special Commendation Award at the Tenth Annual Index on Censorship Freedom of Expression Awards. She also made the 2010 Happy List for her persistence that "led to the MPs' expenses scandal, introducing us to house flipping, duck houses and other fiddles. The happiness came, first, with the delicious details; second with the moral superiority we can now feel over those who legislate and lecture us on how to live."

The Washington Coalition for Open Government granted Brooke a "Key Award", "in honor of a good deed in advancement of open government." The Coalition also gave her a pre-conference reception and keynote placement in their first Washington State Open Government Conference. The Keynote was a through debriefing of operations conducted to liberate Britain. Brooke included a personal account of her role in the MPs expenses scandal in her second book, The Silent State: How Secrecy and Misinformation are Destroying Democracy (2010).

In recognition of her work, the UK Press Gazette ranked Brooke as number 5 in their Top 10 list of journalists in February 2013.

=== WikiLeaks reporting and significant appearances ===
Brooke has continued to blog about freedom of information issues, as well as writing and speaking at conferences. She was commissioned in 2010 to write her third book, The Revolution Will Be Digitised (2011), exploring "the world of computer hackers, internet whistleblowers and pro-democracy campaigners," and including in-depth research on WikiLeaks. Brooke stated "It was clear to me from my own reporting and campaigning around freedom of information that society is undergoing a radical transformation. The amount of knowledge in the world is now so vast and technology so adept at zero-cost duplication that no government, company or organisation can hope to keep control." She went on to say that, "When I met Julian Assange of Wikileaks he was still a little-known figure but his stories of battles fought to free information and ambitions to free even more in future spurred me to begin writing this book."

While working on The Revolution Will Be Digitised (2011), Heather Brooke received a copy of the documents from a disgruntled WikiLeaks volunteer consisting of the raw material of the United States diplomatic cables leak. Brooke worked with The Guardian to edit and publish the material, while concerned about genuine harm minimisation. In an op-ed published in The Guardian on 29 November 2010, she wrote: "Leaks are not the problem; they are the symptom. They reveal a disconnect between what people want and need to know and what they actually do know. The greater the secrecy, the more likely a leak. The way to move beyond leaks is to ensure a robust regime for the public to access important information."

Brooke also starred in We Steal Secrets: The Story of WikiLeaks as a pundit giving commentary based on her freedom of information campaigning experience and dealings with Julian Assange. In the film, Brooke said re: Wikileaks' publishing of the US State Department's diplomatic cables, "It was that whole Wizard of Oz moment. We all look at these politicians – oh wow, they're so powerful – and then it was the little dog pulling the curtain away."

=== Director of Republic Campaign ===
Brooke is also a Director of Republic Campaign Ltd which aims to remove the Monarchy from Britain and thereby the Commonwealth. This would lead to a change of the structure of government from the current system of it being a Constitutional Monarchy to an as-yet undetermined system of government. This change would have consequences for all the countries in the realm of the Commonwealth whose Head of State is the Monarch.

== Bibliography ==
- Your Right to Know: A Citizens Guide to Freedom of Information. Pluto Press, 2004.
- The Silent State: Secrets, Surveillance and the Myth of British Democracy. William Heinemann, 2010.
- The Revolution Will Be Digitised. William Heinemann, 2011.
