= Black spider memos =

Charles III's advocacy letters as prince

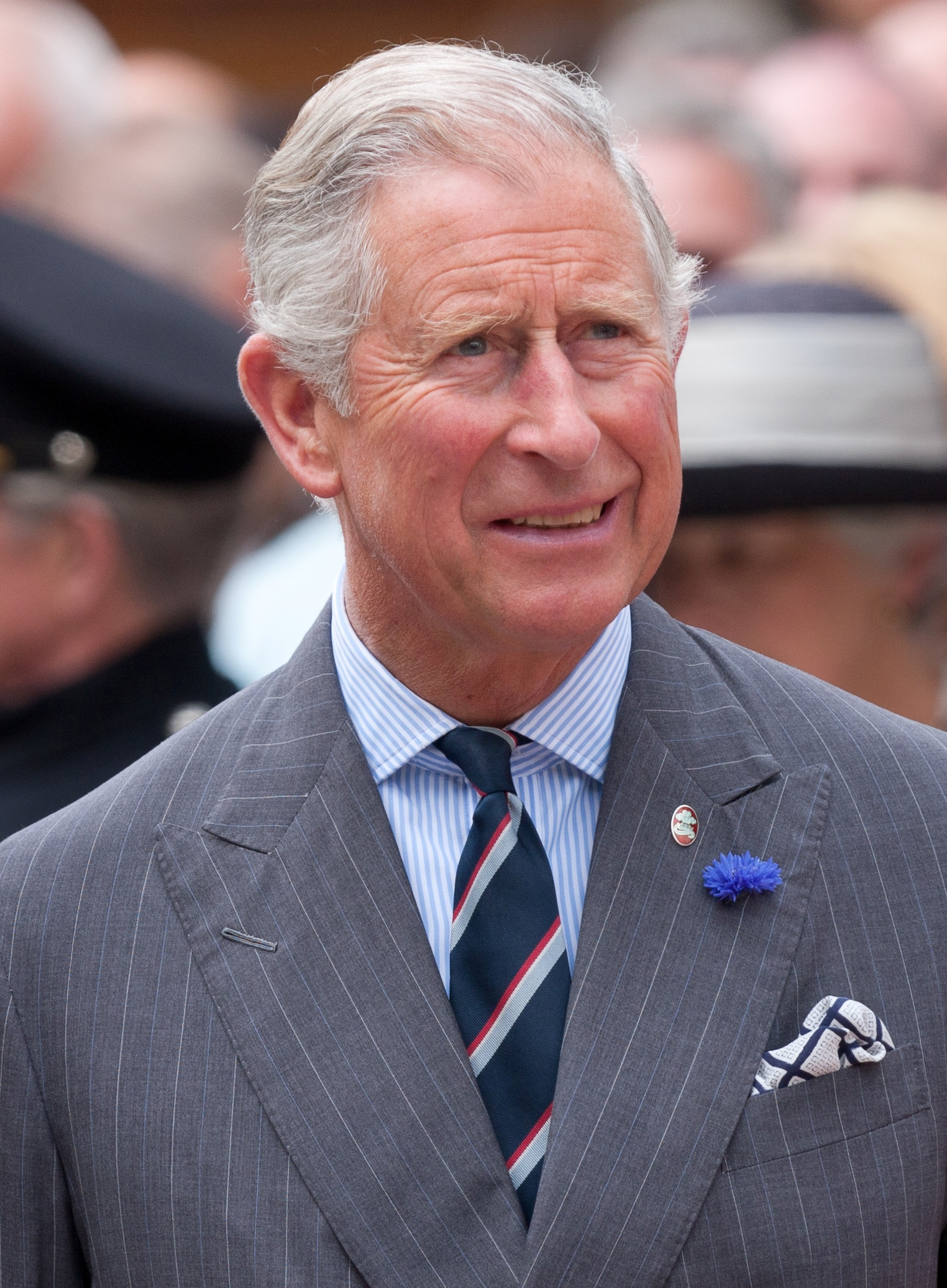
Charles, Prince of Wales, in 2012. Charles acceded to the throne as King Charles III ten years later.

The "black spider" memos are letters and memorandums written by Charles III of the United Kingdom, during his tenure as Prince of Wales, to British government ministers and politicians over several years. As the modern British monarch remains politically neutral by convention, the letters were controversial because of Charles' then-position as eldest child of the British monarch Queen Elizabeth II and heir apparent to the British throne.

The letters were sent by Charles in a private capacity, but concerns have been raised that they may represent the exercise of undue influence over British government ministers. Issues about which Charles has expressed public views include farming, genetic modification, global warming, social deprivation, planning and architecture. This led the press to label Charles as a "meddling prince". The content of the "black spider" letters, named after Charles' distinctive handwriting, was known only anecdotally and from memoirs and leaks, until 13 May 2015 when the Information Tribunal ordered the release of most of the correspondence.

These events were set in motion in 2010, when The Guardian journalist Rob Evans made an application under British Freedom of Information legislation to see the Prince's 2004 and 2005 letters to ministers. After several legal cases the application was eventually refused by the Attorney General Dominic Grieve in October 2012, and the case was the subject of an appeal in the Supreme Court which, in March 2015, ruled against the government's decision, and allowed for the later publication of the letters.

Upon their release, the memos were variously described in the press as "underwhelming" and "harmless", and The Daily Telegraph claimed that their release had "backfired on those who seek to belittle him".

== Background ==
Charles' letters are written by hand before being sent to be typed up. After the letters are returned to Charles to sign, he often adds additional comments in flowing black or red ink across the page using underlining and exclamation marks. It is these additions and his distinctive spidery handwriting that have given his letters their nickname.

Charles has written to ministers on the understanding that his remarks are private.

Letters to ministers have also been sent from the Prince's charities, foundations and campaign groups. These letters have been described as "advocacy correspondence", written by the Prince to advance the work of his charities or in an attempt to promote his views.

The principal private secretary to the Prince of Wales, Sir Michael Peat, said in 2007 that the Prince "...is always very careful to ensure he is not politically contentious or party political, and as far as I am aware even his most ardent critic has never suggested he is."

== The "dissident" prince ==
In 2006, the former deputy private secretary and press adviser to the Prince of Wales, Mark Bolland, said that the Prince had referred to himself as a "dissident" who worked against the prevailing political consensus. Concerning Charles's views, Bolland said that he "...routinely meddled in political issues and wrote sometimes in extreme terms to ministers, MP's and others in positions of political power and influence...The prince used all the means of communication at his disposal, including meetings with ministers and others, speeches and correspondence with leaders in all walks of life and politicians. He was never party-political, but to argue that he was not political was difficult...These letters were not merely routine and non-controversial...but written at times in extreme terms...containing his views on political matters and individual politicians at home and abroad and on international issues...I remember on many occasions seeing in these day files letters which, for example, denounced the elected leaders of other countries in extreme terms, and other such highly politically sensitive correspondence."

In 2009, a spokesperson for the Prince said that his role as a privy counsellor gave him the right to communicate confidentially with ministers on matters that concern him, adding that communication between the Prince and ministers should be treated as private and confidential on all sides. In 2002, the Prince's office issued a statement defending his right to privately correspond with government ministers. The 2002 statement said that the Prince "...takes an active interest in all aspects of British life and believes that as well as celebrating success, part of his role must be to highlight problems and represent views in danger of not being heard...this role can only be fulfilled properly if complete confidentiality is maintained...It is proper and right that he should take an interest in British life. It is not about exerting undue pressure or campaigning privately."

In 2008, the Prince's friend and biographer, Jonathan Dimbleby, said that royal aides had informally started to consider redefining the role of the monarch to allow a future King Charles "...to speak out on matters of national and international importance in ways that at the moment would be unthinkable".

== The 'Cumbrian farmer letter' and letters to Blair and Irvine ==
A letter from Charles to the then Prime Minister Tony Blair was leaked on the day of the Countryside Alliance's 'Liberty and Livelihood' protest march in September 2002. In the letter, Charles associated himself with the views of a farmer from Cumbria, who, complaining of the British government's treatment of rural workers said that "If we, as a group, were black or gay we would not be victimised or picked on." Charles also wrote that if rural people were "any other minority" the government would make greater efforts to protect them. The government was also blamed for "destroying the countryside". Charles was believed to have written the letter in April 2002, and advisers were said to have attempted to persuade him not to send it, and suggested that Charles raise the issue with Blair when next they met. It was not known who "leaked" the letter, with speculation falling on a variety of sources including 10 Downing Street, the Labour Party, sources close to Charles's household, or the Conservative Member of Parliament Nicholas Soames. The allegation was denied by 10 Downing Street and Soames.

Charles wrote regularly to Blair and they would meet at least four times a year when Blair was Prime Minister. It was said that the Lord Chancellor, Lord Irvine, had complained "bitterly" about being "bombarded" by letters from Charles, but this was denied by Irvine. Letters to Irvine in June 2001 had complained about the Human Rights Act and were critical of the "degree to which our lives are becoming ruled by a truly absurd degree of politically correct interference". Charles also complained to Irvine that the United Kingdom was "sliding inexorably down the slope of ever increasing, petty-minded litigiousness" and wrote in 2002 about "ever-more prescriptive laws – for example, health and safety at work legislation, the blame culture...and the bureaucratic red tape which accompanies new rules".

== Qatari letters, Chelsea Barracks scheme ==
The Prince of Wales has occasionally written about architectural projects that utilise styles that he is aesthetically opposed to, such as modernism and functionalism. In 2009 the Prince wrote to the Qatari royal family, the developers of the Chelsea Barracks site in west London, labelling architect Richard Rogers's design for the site "unsuitable" and the plans "a gigantic experiment with the very soul of our capital city". Rogers was subsequently removed from the project and The Prince's Foundation for the Built Environment was appointed to propose an alternative. Rogers claimed the Prince had also intervened to block his designs for the Royal Opera House and Paternoster Square, and condemned Charles's actions as "an abuse of power" and "unconstitutional". Lord Foster, Zaha Hadid, Jacques Herzog, Jean Nouvel, Renzo Piano, and Frank Gehry, among others, wrote a letter to The Sunday Times complaining that the Prince's "private comments" and "behind-the-scenes lobbying" subverted the "open and democratic planning process". Piers Gough and other architects condemned Charles's views as "elitist" in a letter encouraging colleagues to boycott a speech given by the Prince to RIBA in 2009.

== 2004–05 letters: FOI campaign by The Guardian ==
In 2010, Rob Evans, a journalist for The Guardian newspaper, applied under the Freedom of Information Act 2000 to see copies of correspondence between Charles and ministers in seven government departments. The government refused to grant the request. The ministerial recipients of the letters and the dates which they were received were also deemed to be secret by the government. The 27 letters concerned were written between September 2004 and April 2005. The Guardian's challenge was the first of its kind to attempt to obtain royal correspondence.

Evans wished to see letters between Charles and the Department for Business, Innovation and Skills, the Department of Health, the Department for Children, the Department for Education, the Department for Environment, Food and Rural Affairs, the Department for Culture, Media and Sport, the Northern Ireland Office and the Cabinet Office.

=== 2009: Further letters revealed, Prime Ministerial block on disclosure ===
In addition to the letters sent in 2004 and 2005 sought by The Guardian, the same paper had revealed in 2009 that Charles had written directly to eight government ministers since 2006. The Department for Environment, Food and Rural Affairs, the Department for International Development, HM Treasury, the Foreign and Commonwealth Office, the Department for Work and Pensions, the Department for Education and Skills, the Department for Communities and Local Government, and the Department for Culture, Media and Sport all received personal letters from Charles between 2006 and 2009. The government refused to release the content of the letters sent between 2006 and 2009.

In addition to Charles's letters, his advisers had also written to five government departments and to members of the cabinet seeking to bring the government's policy into line with Charles's beliefs on matters such as the building of hospitals and ecotown design. Aides from the Charles's architectural charity had written to the then Secretary of State for Communities and Local Government, Hazel Blears, urging the government to adopt his positions on ecological design and planning. The Secretary of State for Health, Patricia Hewitt, also received letters from Charles's aides, who recommended the adoption by hospital trusts of design techniques devised by his architectural charity. The Chief Secretary to the Treasury, Andy Burnham, also received letters concerning the sustainable increase of the housing supply in a way "which provides support for the [prince's] Foundation's mission to promote timeless and ecological ways of planning, designing and building".

In December 2009, Prime Minister Gordon Brown ordered a block on the disclosure of correspondence sent to ministers by members of the royal family at the same time as the information commissioner, Christopher Graham, blocked the release of an earlier set of correspondence which involved Prime Minister Blair.

=== 2010: Initial FOI appeal ===
At the FOI appeal tribunal in September 2010, Paul Richards, a former special adviser to the former communities secretary Hazel Blears and health secretary Patricia Hewitt, said that it was clear to him that Charles regularly corresponded with ministers and these letters went "to the top of the pile" and are "treated with great reverence." This is in contrast to letters from ordinary citizens, which "...go through a centralised mailroom and which are normally dealt with by departmental staff and rarely seen by ministers or their advisers." Richards had been a special adviser from 2005 to 2009 and said that Charles wrote on issues including planning applications and government health policy. Richards believed that lobbying from Charles had contributed to a £1.1m grant awarded to his Foundation for Integrated Health. Richards believed that the grant arose after "behind-the-scenes lobbying" from Charles, and occurred at the same time as a reception hosted by the prince at his London residence, Clarence House, attended by at least one health minister and an adviser to Prime Minister Blair.

Richards said that Charles had complained to education secretary Ed Balls about changes to the primary school syllabus and had lobbied Yvette Cooper over the design of ecotowns.

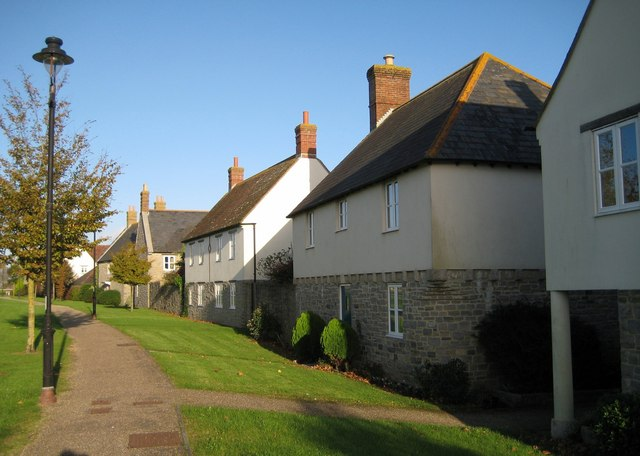
Housing in the village of Poundbury, Dorset

Charles had written to Blears after she had suggested that Poundbury, in Dorset, a village built according to the prince's architectural precepts, was "little more than a royal ego trip". The letter from Charles subsequently invited Blears to Poundbury, with Richards describing the letter as "...treated with great reverence and went straight to the top of the pile in the red box containing the minister's business for the day, over and above letters from other ministers and even cabinet papers."

The appeal also heard evidence from Rodney Brazier, a professor of constitutional law at Manchester University, who said that Charles corresponds with ministers "to a much greater extent than his predecessors". Brazier said that the quantity of Charles's letter writing amounted to a "constitutional innovation" but that he considered the process to be part of "the apprenticeship convention" served by the heir to the throne, in which Charles educates himself in the nature of state affairs.

The hearing was subsequently adjourned until 2011 for reasons that the panel "could not go into".

=== 2010: FOI amendment ===
The Freedom of Information Act was amended in 2010 to provide more protection over the communications with senior members of the British royal family, communications with the monarch, the heir to the throne and second in line to the throne would all be subject to an absolute exemption for twenty years or five years after the death of the individual, whichever occurs later. The changes were described as the "Prince Charles amendment" by Tony Wright MP.

=== 2012: Successful Upper Tribunal appeal, Attorney General's veto ===
In September 2012 the Administrative Appeals Chamber of the Upper Tribunal, in a unanimous decision, ruled that the letters should be published, overturning the previous ruling of information commissioner from 2010. The appeals chamber found that the commissioner had given "insufficient weight to the public interest", when he chose to deny the disclosure of the letters, and found that it was in the public interest "for there to be transparency as to how and when Prince Charles seeks to influence government". The tribunal also found evidence of "Prince Charles using his access to government ministers, and no doubt considering himself entitled to use that access, in order to set up and drive forward charities and promote views, but not as part of his preparation for kingship...Ministers responded, and no doubt felt themselves obliged to respond, but again not as part of Prince Charles's preparation for kingship." The tribunal also ruled that "it was fundamental" that Charles's lobbying "cannot have constitutional status" and must not be protected from disclosure. In evidence given to the tribunal, Stephen Lamport, who was the private secretary to the Prince of Wales from 1993 to 2002 said that Charles will stop writing to ministers were he to be crowned King, and that his letters formed part of his "apprenticeship convention", in which the "cardinal principle" of not commenting on public policy did not apply to him while heir. Lamport believed that if what the Prince "...says or writes to ministers were not to be confidential their exchanges would be 'bland and denuded' of any useful content" and that Charles viewed the "urging of opinions" to government ministers to be part of his role as heir.

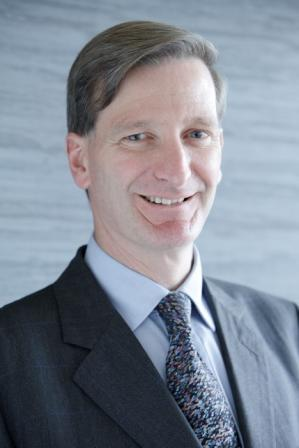
Dominic Grieve, Attorney General for England and Wales, 2010–14

The Upper Tribunal's decision was subsequently vetoed in October 2012 by the Attorney General for England and Wales, Dominic Grieve, who was supported in his decision by the Cabinet of the United Kingdom. The attorney general's veto placed an absolute block on the publication of the letters, which Grieve described as containing the "particularly frank" and "most deeply held personal views and beliefs" of the Prince of Wales. Grieve detailed the letters as containing "...remarks about public affairs which would in my view, if revealed, have had a material effect upon the willingness of the government to engage in correspondence with the Prince of Wales, and would potentially have undermined his position of political neutrality....my decision is based on my view that the correspondence was undertaken as part of the Prince of Wales's preparation for becoming king. The Prince of Wales engaged in this correspondence with ministers with the expectation that it would be confidential. Disclosure of the correspondence could damage the Prince of Wales's ability to perform his duties when he becomes king." Grieve concluded his justification of his veto by stating that "It is a matter of the highest importance within our constitutional framework that the monarch is a politically neutral figure able to engage in confidence with the government of the day, whatever its political colour." Grieve also said that any perception that Charles had disagreed with Blair's government "would be seriously damaging to his role as future monarch because, if he forfeits his position of political neutrality as heir to the throne, he cannot easily recover it when he is king". The Guardian announced its intention to challenge the attorney general's veto in the High Court of Justice.

=== 2013: The Guardian's legal challenge dismissed ===
The Guardian's challenge to the attorney general's veto in the High Court was dismissed by the Lord Chief Justice of England and Wales, Lord Judge, accompanied by Lord Justice Davis and Justice Globe in July 2013. Lord Judge found the attorney general had acted in the public interest in a "proper and rational way".

The ability of government ministers to issue a veto under the FoI act and override a decision that had been reached by judges raised "troublesome concerns" for Lord Judge. The veto means that potentially a ruling by the Supreme Court could be overridden.

This legal situation was described by Lord Judge as a "'constitutional aberration". Lord Judge wrote that barristers could find no equivalent in any other British law, and that it was "an understatement to describe the situation as unusual". Lord Judge added that the necessary safeguards for the constitutionality of the process were guaranteed by the ability to challenge the ministerial override in court. The Guardian announced its decision to appeal against the High Court's decision.

=== 2014: Appeal court rules attorney general's decision unlawful ===
In March 2014, the three judges of the Civil Division of the Court of Appeal of England and Wales, under the Master of the Rolls, Lord Dyson, heard The Guardian's appeal against the High Court decision, and ruled that the attorney general's 2012 decision to block the publication of the letters was unlawful. The court ruled that the attorney general's veto on the letters publication should be quashed as Grieve had "no good reason" for overriding the Upper Tribunal's decision and that Grieve had acted in a way incompatible with European law.

Lord Dyson said that Grieve had "no good reason for overriding the meticulous decision of the Upper Tribunal reached after six days of hearing and argument", adding that Grieve "could point to no error of law or fact in the [tribunal's] decision and the government departments concerned did not even seek permission to appeal it." In addition, Lord Dyson ruled that Grieve's veto was unlawful under European Commission law. Grieve was also ordered at the appeal to pay The Guardian's legal costs of £96,000. The government also delayed disclosure of amount of money spent on legal proceedings in their attempts to resist publication of the letters.

Grieve announced his decision to appeal the ruling to the Supreme Court, with his spokesperson saying that he was appealing to "protect the important principles which are at stake in this case... [his] argument is that it is better to pretend Charles is impartial than to prove he is not." Following the judgement, the editor of The Guardian, Alan Rusbridger, said that Charles was a "powerful person" who should be "above politics". Rusbridger said that "...if the Prince of Wales is going to try and influence public policy in a particularly frank way then I don't think he is acting as a private citizen and therefore like any other lobby group there ought to be transparency about what he's trying to do."

=== 2014: Supreme Court hearing ===
The Supreme Court heard the case on the black spider memos on 24 and 25 November 2014, before Lord Neuberger and six other senior judges.

On the first day of the hearing, James Eadie QC, acting for the government, said that it had been acceptable for the attorney general to veto the Upper Tribunal's (UT) decision, stating that "It is clear that parliament decided...that the highest level of government should be permitted to have the final say as to whether information, the disclosure of which it considered to be damaging to the public interest, should be disclosed." Eadie said that parliament had given the attorney general the power to override rulings by the UT "to protect the public interest where real and significant issues arise".

On the second day of the hearing, Dinah Rose QC, acting for The Guardian, said that in contrast to the UT, Grieve was "...neither independent nor impartial but is a member of the government which is seeking to prevent disclosure of the documents. He has not conducted any hearing, or heard representations by [The Guardian]." Additionally Grieve had not identified any error by the UT and had simply disagreed with its conclusions for "...reasons which had already been advanced by the government departments, considered and rejected by the tribunal." Rose said that Grieve's use of the veto "significantly undermines the rule of law and the principle of the separation of powers".

=== 2015: Supreme Court verdict and publication ===
The Supreme Court dismissed the Attorney General's appeal on 26 March, and by a majority of 5 to 2 'considered that the Attorney General was not entitled to issue a certificate under section 53 of FOIA'. Clarence House expressed disappointment. The letters were subsequently published by the Cabinet Office on 13 May 2015.

== Reception ==
The reception of the memos met with little criticism, and public support for the Prince of Wales.

Dina Spector of Business Insider called the publication of the memos "underwhelming" and gave three reasons why Britain would feel the same way. According to her, firstly, Charles and his staff were reportedly "sanguine" about the decision to publish the letters and there were claims by those who had read the letters that they were mostly harmless. Additionally, even if they did contain some damaging material, the letters would be published with some redactions to avoid naming third parties. Furthermore, fewer than 10 of the 27 published letters were personally authored by Charles and all of them are typed out rather than handwritten in the "black spider" handwriting.

Historian Andrew Roberts wrote in The Daily Telegraph that the publication of Charles' letters "backfired on those who seek to belittle him, and revealed the idiocy of the human rights industry". Roberts further felt the memos exposed Charles' "passion and dignity".

Simon Jenkins of The Guardian wrote: "The black spiders are harmless creatures compared with the multimillion-pound tarantulas of big-time political pressure, uncharted and undisclosed." An editorial in The Guardian stated that "The letters show that behind that curtain, most of the time, Prince Charles behaves more as a bit of a bore on behalf of his good causes than as any sort of wannabe feudal tyrant."

Clarence House issued a statement defending Charles, saying that he cared deeply about the country and had tried to use his unique position to help others. Furthermore, it stated that he had raised issues of public concern, and tried to find practical ways to address them. It also defended Charles' right to communicate privately stating that the publication of his letters "inhibits his ability to express the concerns and suggestions" put forward to him by people at meetings and engagements.
