= Access to Information Central Clearing House =

UK government agency

The Access to Information Central Clearing House was established by the UK Government in January 2005. The Central Clearing House was set up to ensure consistent application of the Data Protection Act 1998, the Freedom of Information Act 2000, and the Environmental Information Regulations (EIRs) across Central Government. The Central Clearing House provides expert advice for cases referred to the Information Commissioner or Information Tribunal.

Procedures exist to ensure that all requests which activate one of a number of 'triggers' are referred to the Clearing House.

== Controversies ==
Critics have blamed the Central Clearing House for the rising number of appeals to the Information Commissioner and for 'being bent on blocking as many requests for information as it can'.

In June 2020, openDemocracy published an investigation that found that the House had blocked the release of information related to the contaminated blood scandal in the United Kingdom. The files, eventually released in 2018, showed that the British government had privately admitted that some health authorities had been negligent.

On 8 of June 2021 the UK government lost a request for a freedom of information request appeal in regards to details about the Clearing house, the action was brought by openDemocracy. In its defence the cabinet office had offered a Wikipedia article. Judge Hughes, concluding said that there was a “profound lack of transparency about the operation” that “might appear … to extend to ministers” and that the tribunal had been misled by the department, headed by Michael Gove.

An investigation by Politico Europe published on 12 June 2021 found that the Clearing House kept a list of journalists that made FOI requests and used it to determine whether those requests would be granted, in breach of the rule that FOI requests should be evaluated applicant-blind. Politico's investigation also found that the House blocked requests even when the Trade Department recommended granting them.

In September 2021, Minister for the Cabinet Office Chloe Smith announced that government would undertake an "assessment of the role of the Clearing House." The House of Commons Public Administration and Constitutional Affairs Committee is also undertaken its own review of the Clearing House. Later that month, openDemocracy further revealed that the Clearing House had interfered with release of information surrounding the Grenfell Tower fire.

== Triggers for referring requests to Central Clearing House ==
The Government has published a list of triggers which will result in request being referred to the Central Clearing House these triggers fall under five main headings:

- Prime ministerial and ministerial issues
- Royal Household and honours
- Procurement and efficiency
- Cross-Whitehall issues
- Ministerial veto certificates and security
