= Skai Jackson =

American actress (born 2002)

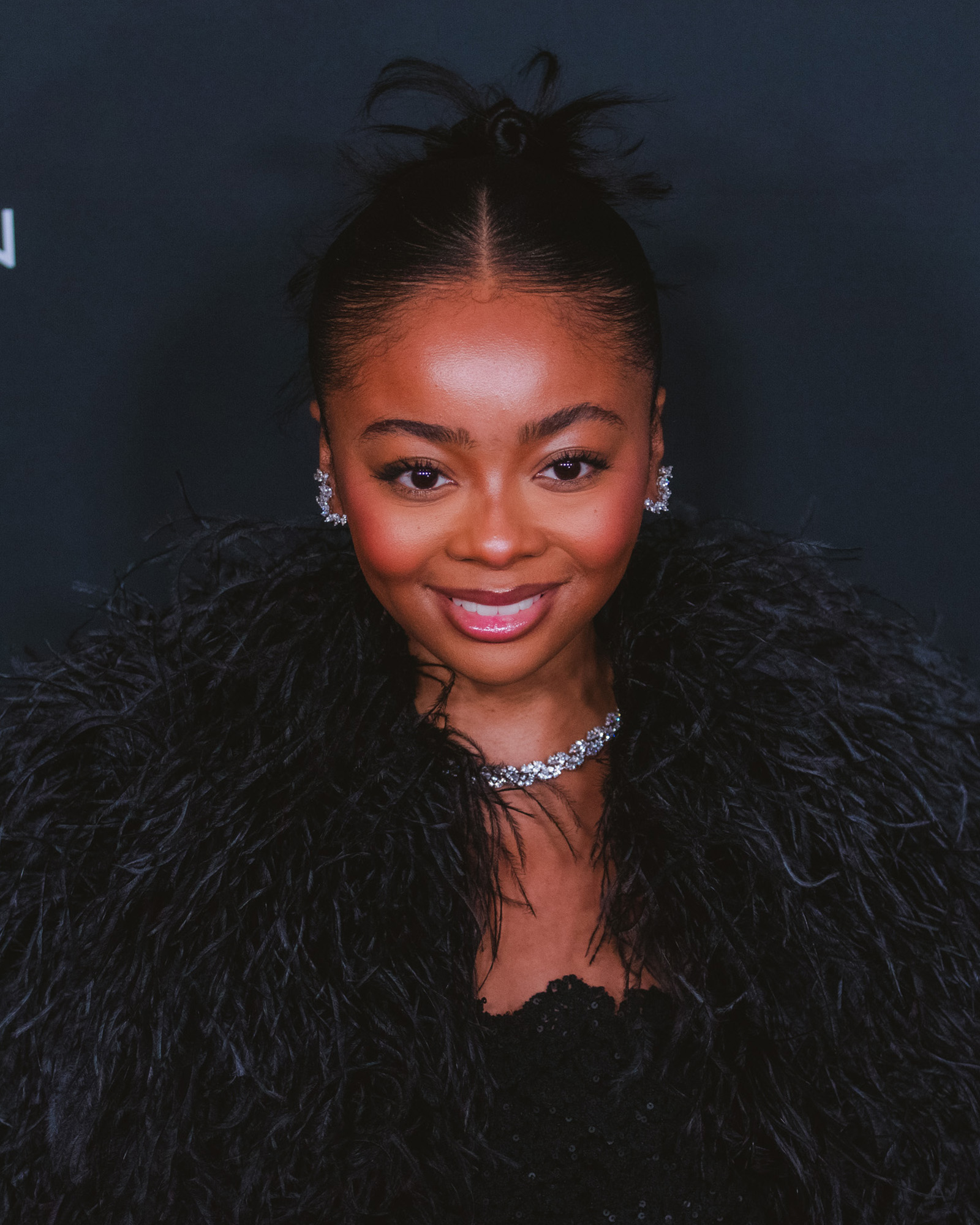
- Jackson in 2026
- Born: April 8, 2002 (age 24); Staten Island, New York City, U.S.
- Occupation: Actress
- Years active: 2007–present
- Children: 1

Skai Jackson (born April 8, 2002) is an American actress. With such accolades as a Shorty Award and a nomination for an NAACP Image Award, she was featured in Time's list of the most influential teens in 2016.

After early child acting roles in the independent film Liberty Kid (2007) and with cameos in The Rebound (2009) and The Smurfs (2011), Jackson gained recognition for her starring role as Zuri Ross in the Disney Channel comedy series Jessie (2011–2015) and its spin-off series Bunk'd (2015–2018). She received an NAACP Image Award nomination for the role.

Jackson has since voiced characters in the Marvel Rising franchise (2018–2019) and DreamWorks Dragons: Rescue Riders (2019–2022), and starred in the film Sheroes (2023). Her memoir Reach for the Skai: How to Inspire, Empower, and Clapback was released in 2019. Jackson was also a semi-finalist on the 29th season of Dancing with the Stars (2020). She has also been recognized for her social media presence.

== Early life ==
Jackson was born in the Staten Island borough of New York City. Her parents divorced when she was young, and she was raised primarily by her mother. She is of Afro-Honduran and African-American descent. Jackson began her career as a child model, appearing in numerous national commercials, including for Band-Aid, Coca-Cola, Pepsi, and Old Navy.

== Career ==
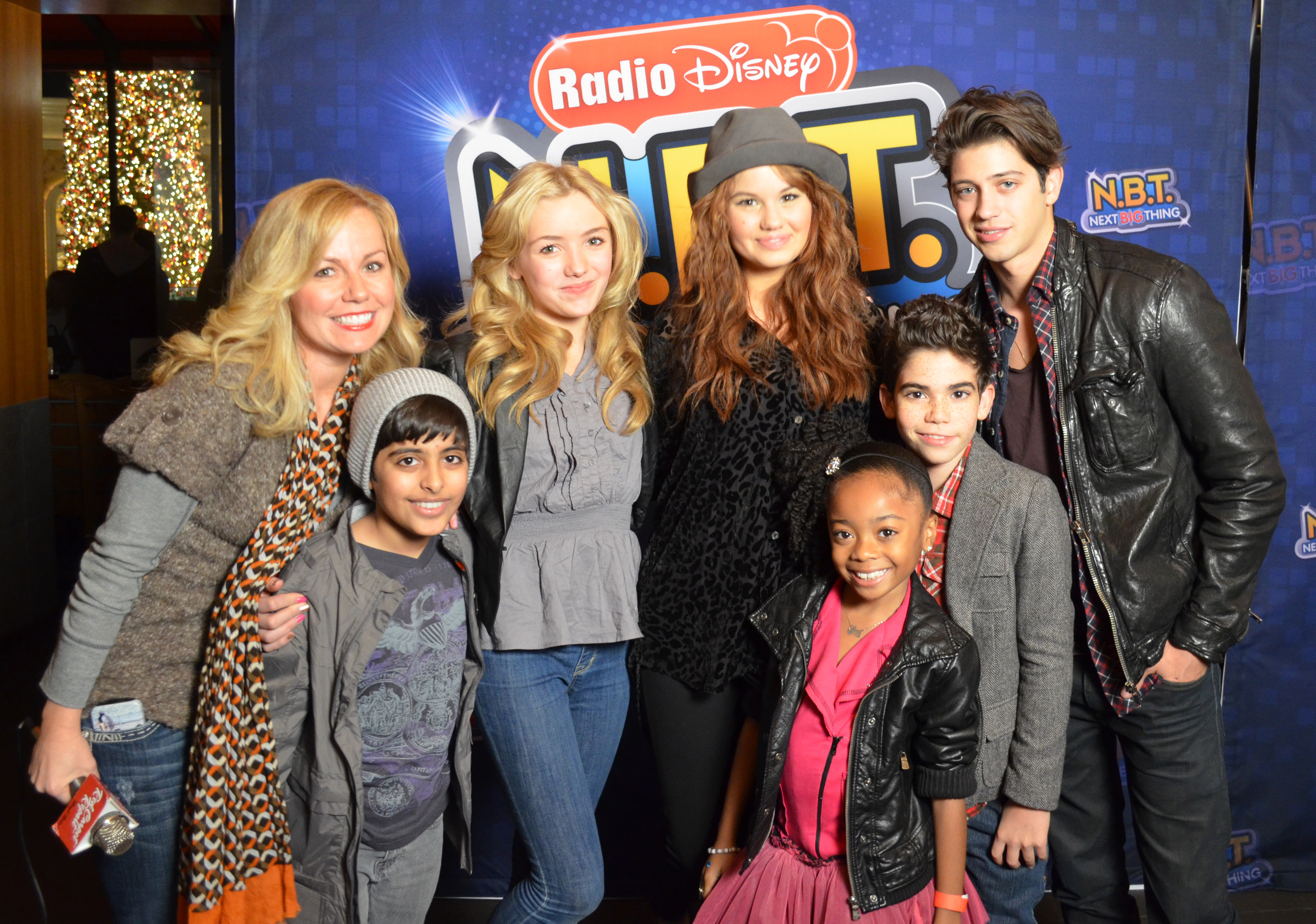
The cast of Jessie in 2011

Jackson's first major acting role was in the 2007 independent film Liberty Kid, which was followed by a guest appearance in a 2008 episode of Rescue Me. In 2009, Jackson made a cameo in the film The Rebound, and was cast as Little Fish in the Nickelodeon pre-school animated series Bubble Guppies. She followed this with minor roles in the television series Team Umizoomi, Royal Pains and Boardwalk Empire, and the 2011 films Arthur and The Smurfs.

In 2011, Jackson was cast as Zuri Ross in the Disney Channel sitcom Jessie, which aired for four seasons and ended in 2015. For the role, she received an NAACP Image Award nomination. In 2013, she appeared as Joetta Watson in the Hallmark Channel television film The Watsons Go To Birmingham. In 2014, she guest-starred in an episode of Disney XD's animated series Ultimate Spider-Man. From 2015 to 2018, she reprised the role of Zuri in the series Bunk'd. She was included on Time magazine's list of "Most Influential Teens" in 2016, and was nominated for Best Influencer at the Shorty Awards in 2017.

Artist Mike Deodato, a co-creator of Ironheart / Riri Williams, confirmed that Skai Jackson inspired the Marvel comic book character. Jackson stated she would like to play Ironheart in a live-action adaptation. She auditioned for an unnamed role in the 2018 Marvel film Black Panther. Marvel eventually cast Dominique Thorne as Ironheart for the second Black Panther film and the subsequent MCU projects.

In 2018, Jackson made a guest appearance in Marvel Rising: Initiation as Glory Grant, a role she reprised in Marvel Rising: Chasing Ghosts, and Marvel Rising: Battle of the Bands. In 2019, she appeared in the music video for Lil Nas X's "Panini", which went viral and spawned several memes due to her character being unable to escape the rapper.

In 2019, Jackson made her writing debut with the book Reach for the Skai: How to Inspire, Empower, and Clapback, and began voicing Summer on the Netflix animated series DreamWorks Dragons: Rescue Riders, which ended in 2020.

In 2020, Jackson was announced as one of the celebrities competing on the 29th season of Dancing with the Stars with Alan Bersten. The pair made it to the semi-finals, and finished at 10th. In 2023, Jackson appeared in the action film Sheroes, her first feature film role in 10 years. Also in 2023, Jackson received scrutiny for hosting a $5 raffle with a MacBook as a prize through CashApp, and was accused of scamming her followers in order to gain money. Jackson said in response: "It is not that serious, for a damn $5. It is called a raffle."

In March 2024, Jackson became the brand ambassador for Cantu Beauty.

== Personal life ==
In March 2020, Jackson filed court papers for a restraining order against rapper Bhad Bhabie claiming that she had harassed her. The petition was temporarily granted, and later dropped by Jackson. On August 8, 2024, Jackson was arrested at Universal Studios Hollywood on suspicion of domestic battery. In September, the office of the Los Angeles County District Attorney declined to file charges against Jackson.

In November 2024, she confirmed to People that she was expecting her first child with then-boyfriend Deondre Burgin. She gave birth to their son in January 2025. In May 2025, she requested a restraining order against Burgin, accusing him of assault and battery.

Jackson has attention deficit hyperactivity disorder.

== Filmography ==
=== Film ===
Year	Title	Role	Notes
2007	Liberty Kid	Young Destiny	Independent film
2008	Rescue Me	Little Girl	Short film
2009	The Rebound	Museum Little Girl #1	
2011	Arthur	Little Girl	
2011	The Smurfs	Kicking Girl	
2013	G.I. Joe: Retaliation	Roadblock's daughter	
2014	My Dad's a Soccer Mom	Lacy Casey	
2023	Big Boss	Young Keke Palmer	Short film
2023	Sheroes	Daisy	
2023	The Man in the White Van	Patty	

=== Television ===
Year	Title	Role	Notes
2006	Sesame Street	Herself	
2010	Team Umizoomi	Kayla	Voice role; episode: "The Rolling Toy Parade"
2010	Royal Pains	Maddie Phillips	Episode: "Big Whoop"
2010–2012	Kick Buttowski: Suburban Daredevil	Madison	Recurring voice role
2011	Boardwalk Empire	Aneisha	Episode: "What Does the Bee Do?"
2011–2013	Bubble Guppies	Little Fish	Main voice role
2011–2015	Jessie	Zuri Ross	Main role
2012	Austin & Ally	Zuri Ross	Episode: "Austin & Jessie & Ally All Star New Year"
2012–2014	Dora the Explorer	Isa the Iguana	Recurring voice role
2013	Good Luck Charlie	Zuri Ross	Episode: "Good Luck Jessie: NYC Christmas"
2013	The Watsons Go to Birmingham	Joetta Watson	Television film
2014	Ultimate Spider-Man	Zuri Ross	Voice role; episode: "Halloween Night at the Museum"
2015–2018	Bunk'd	Zuri Ross	Main role
2015	K.C. Undercover	Zuri Ross	Episode: "All Howl's Eve"
2018	Culture Clash	Aisha	Television film
2018	Marvel Rising: Initiation	Glory Grant	Voice role; 2 episodes
2019	Marvel Rising: Chasing Ghosts	Glory Grant	Voice role
2019	Marvel Rising: Battle of the Bands	Glory Grant	Voice role
2019–2022	DreamWorks Dragons: Rescue Riders	Summer	Voice role
2019	Marvel Rising: Operation Shuri	Glory Grant	Voice role
2020	Dancing with the Stars	Herself	Contestant with Alan Bersten; eliminated 10th
2021	A Black Lady Sketch Show	Ceecee	Episode: "If I'm Paying These Chili's Prices, You Cannot Taste My Steak!"
2021	Muppets Haunted Mansion	Singing Bust	Disney+
2025	BMF	Ashleigh	Recurring role; 3 episodes

=== Music videos ===
- "Panini" (2019), by Lil Nas X

== Bibliography ==
- Reach for the Skai: How to Inspire, Empower, and Clapback (2019)

== Awards and nominations ==
Award	Year	Category	Work	Result	Ref.
NAACP Image Awards	2016	Outstanding Performance by a Youth - Series, Special, Television Movie or Mini-series	Jessie	Nominated	
Shorty Awards	2017	Best Influencer and Celebrity	Herself	Nominated	
Young Entertainer Awards	2018	Best Young Ensemble in a Television Series	Bunk'd	Won	
