= On Expenses =

2010 British television film

- Genre: Satirical drama
- Based on: United Kingdom parliamentary expenses scandal
- Written by: Tony Saint
- Directed by: Simon Cellan Jones
- Starring: Anna Maxwell Martin; Brian Cox; Alex Jennings; Neil Pearson; Tim Pigott-Smith
- Theme music composer: Solo bagpiper Jaimie H. Gibb, joined by his pipe band, Schiehallion Pipes and Drums
- Country of origin: United Kingdom
- Original language: English

Production
- Producer: Stephen Wright
- Running time: 60 minutes

Original release
- Release: 23 February 2010

On Expenses is a 2010 British television film directed by Simon Cellan Jones and starring Anna Maxwell Martin as Heather Brooke and Brian Cox as Michael Martin.

The film documents the true story of journalist Heather Brooke's attempt to get expenses claims of Members of Parliament released under the Freedom of Information Act 2000 and Speaker Michael Martin's battle to prevent it. Brooke herself had a non-speaking cameo in the film as a female MP in the scene where Martin assumes the position of Speaker.

== Cast ==
Actor	Character
Anna Maxwell Martin	Heather Brooke
Brian Cox	Michael Martin MP
Neil Pearson	Hugh Tomlinson
Alex Jennings	Andrew Walker, head of UK Parliament Fees Office
Tim Pigott-Smith	Alan Keen MP
David Calder	Sir Stuart Bell MP
Sam Graham	David Maclean MP
Alan Parnaby	Chris Huhne MP
Geoffrey Beevers	Douglas Hogg MP
