= David Calder (actor) =

British actor

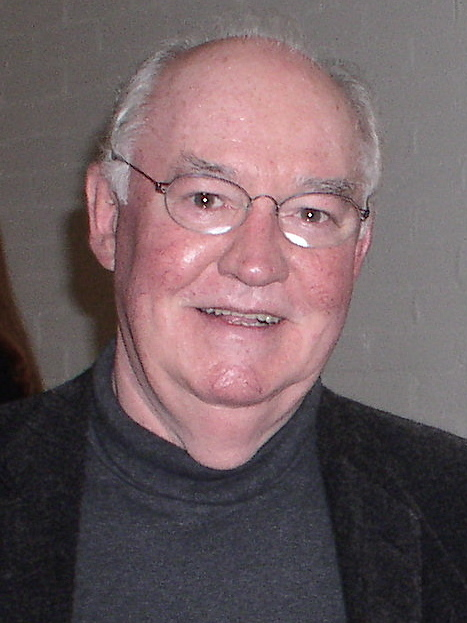
- Calder at the National Theatre Studio on 3 November 2009
- Born: David Ian Calder; 1 August 1946 (age 80); Portsmouth, Hampshire, England
- Occupation: Actor
- Years active: 1970—present

David Ian Calder (born 1 August 1946) is an English actor. His film and television credits include the 1999 James Bond film The World Is Not Enough, Crown Court, The Professionals, Enemy at the Door, Minder, Mitch, Bergerac, The New Statesman, Between the Lines, Bramwell, Cracker, Dalziel and Pascoe, Heartbeat, Sleepers, Spooks, Midsomer Murders, Hustle, Waking the Dead, Wallis & Edward, A Touch of Frost, Cold Blood, Burn Up, Lewis, Houdini, United, and The Last Front.

== Life and career ==
Calder was born 1 August 1946 in Portsmouth, Hampshire, and trained at the Bristol Old Vic Theatre School. His most high-profile television roles include Det. Insp. George Resnick in the crime series Widows and Nathan Spring in the sci-fi drama Star Cops. In 1989, he appeared in the adaptation of the David Lodge novel Nice Work. In 2012 he portrayed Captain Edward Smith in the ITV mini-series Titanic. From 2005–06, he took on the role of PC George Dixon in the radio adaptation of the BBC's long running television series Dixon of Dock Green.

Calder's other television credits include Crown Court, Boys from the Blackstuff, The Professionals, Enemy at the Door, Minder, Bergerac, The New Statesman, Between the Lines, Bramwell, Cracker, Dalziel and Pascoe, Heartbeat, Sleepers, Spooks, Midsomer Murders, Hustle, Waking the Dead, Wallis & Edward, A Touch of Frost, Cold Blood, Burn Up, Lewis, and Houdini. He also appeared as Harold Hardman, the Manchester United chairman at the time of the Munich air disaster in 1958, in the TV drama United, aired by the BBC in April 2011. In 2013, he played Mr Reid in The Wrong Mans.

Calder appeared as Sir Robert King in the 1999 James Bond film The World Is Not Enough. His other film appearances include Moonlighting (1982), Defence of the Realm (1986), American Friends (1991), Hollow Reed (1996), FairyTale: A True Story (1997), The King Is Alive (2000), Perfume: The Story of a Murderer (2006), The Mummy: Tomb of the Dragon Emperor (2008), and Rush (2013).

In 1979, Calder appeared in a public information film as a crime prevention officer, asking people to consider how they would get into their own home if they lost their keys. The PIF, which was used to encourage people to make their homes secure, and to contact their crime prevention officer for advice, ran until at least 1985. In February 2010, Calder played Stuart Bell in the television film On Expenses.

In October 2016, Calder played Gus, in The Intelligent Homosexual's Guide to Capitalism and Socialism with a Key to the Scriptures by Tony Kushner at the Hampstead Theatre.

In October 2016, Calder appeared as Mr Bruff in the BBC mini-series The Moonstone and from October 2017 in the title role of Julius Caesar at the new Bridge Theatre. This production was broadcast by National Theatre Live in March 2018.

Also in 2018, Calder played a closeted gay man suffering from dementia on BBC's Call the Midwife.

In 2024, Calder played Father Michael in the World War I television film The Last Front.

== Filmography ==
Film
Year	Title	Role	Notes
1970	The Meatrack	J.C.	
1978	Superman	3rd Crewman	(Superman's 1st Night)
1979	All the Fun of the Fair	Pat Collins	
1982	Moonlighting	Supermarket Manager	
1986	Defence of the Realm	Harry Champion	
1991	American Friends	Pollitt	
1996	Hollow Reed	Martin's Lawyer	
1997	FairyTale: A True Story	Harold Snelling	
1999	The World Is Not Enough	Sir Robert King	
2000	The King Is Alive	Charles	
2001	Mr In-Between	Tattooed Man	
2006	Perfume: The Story of a Murderer	Bishop of Grasse	
2006	Goya's Ghosts	Monk 1	
2008	The Mummy: Tomb of the Dragon Emperor	Roger Wilson	
2010	National Theatre Live: Hamlet	Polonius	
2011	United	Harold Hardman	
2013	Rush	Louis Stanley	
2015	Queen of the Desert	Hugh Bell	
2015	The Lady in the Van	Leo Fairchild	
2017	The Hatton Garden Job	Terry Perkins	
2018	National Theatre Live: Julius Caesar	Caesar	
2024	The Last Front	Father Michael	

Television
Year	Title	Role	Notes
24 April 1979	ITV Playhouse	John Marriott	Casting the Runes
26 January 1980	Enemy at the Door	Hoffman	Episode: "No Quarter Given"
June-July 1981	Get_Lost!	Det Sgt Tomlin	Four episodes
2 January 1985	Wynne and Penkovsky	Greville Wynne	
7 February 1987	Bergerac	Sir Clive Hamer	Episode: "SPARTA"
1987	Star Cops	Nathan Spring	Series regular
23 February 1988	The Play on One	Douglas	Episode: "Unreported Incident"
10 April 1991	Sleepers	Victor Chekhov	
20 October 1991	Screen One	Chubb	Episode: "A Question of Attribution"
2 February 1992	Screen Two	Abbé de L'Epée	Episode: "The Count of Solar"
15 May 1992	Friday on My Mind	Wing Commander Donahue	
31 October 1992	Covington Cross	Abbott	Episode: "The Persecution"
13 December 1992	The New Statesman	Le Cul	Episode: "Heil and Farewell"
9 May 1993	The Inspector Alleyn Mysteries	Robert Legge	Episode: "Death at the Bar"
14 December 1994	Between the Lines	Leavis	Episode: "The End User" (2 parts)
22 May 1995	Bramwell	Dr. Robert Bramwell	Major character in series 1, 2, and 3
22 October 1995	Cracker	Michael Harvey	Episode: "Brotherly Love" (3 parts)
8 July 2000	Dalziel and Pascoe	James Marsham	Episode: "Cunning Old Fox"
17 March 2002	Heartbeat	Saul Arkwright	Episode: "The Shoot"
10 June 2002	Spooks	Sergei Lermov	Episode: "The Rose Bed Memoirs"
31 January 2003	Midsomer Murders	George Hamilton	Episode: "Birds of Prey"
11 March 2004	The Inspector Lynley Mysteries	Richard Martin	Episode: "A Traitor to Memory"
16 March 2004	Hustle	Victor Maher	Episode: "Cops and Robbers"
23 October 2005	Waking the Dead	Commander Bill Drake	Episode: "Cold Fusion"
7 November 2005	Trial & Retribution	William Thorpe	Episode: "The Lovers"
5 November 2006	A Touch of Frost	Kenneth Shaw	Episode: "Endangered Species"
25 November 2007	Heartbeat	DI Ludlow	Episode: "Night Mail"
3 September 2009	New Tricks	Sid Lestade	Episode: "Meat is Murder"
2 October 2010	Casualty	Roy Parks	Episode: "Into the Fog"
29 December 2010	Agatha Christie's Marple	Dermot	Episode: “The Blue Geranium”
6 June 2012	Lewis	Andrew Lipton	Episode: "The Indelible Stain"
10 March 2013	Mr Selfridge	King Edward VII	Episode: "Episode 10"
14 January 2014	Father Brown	Sir Aaron Armstrong	Episode: "The Three Tools of Death"
17 February 2014	DCI Banks	Jack Barber	Episode: "Piece of My Heart"
23 August 2014	Casualty	Phillip Perry	Episode: "A Life Less Lived"
21 February 2016	Vera	Frank McAffee	Episode: "The Sea Glass"
16 January 2018	Inside No. 9	Percy	Episode: "Once Removed"
11 March 2018	Call the Midwife	Donald	Episode: "Episode 8"
2021	Time	John Cobden	3 episodes
2021	The Trick	Sir David King	TV film
2017-2022	Motherland	Geoff	3 episodes
2024	Doctors	Lord Rodney Carleton	2 episodes

Podcast series
Date	Title	Role	Notes
2019-2020	The Lovecraft Investigations	Henry Akeley	11 episodes (Radio 4)
2023	The Victory of Joan of Arc	Fontaine	Podcast series
