= Silent Scream (1990 film) =

- Poster
- Directed by: David Hayman
- Written by: Bill Beech
- Produced by: Paddy Higson
- Starring: Iain Glen; Andrew Barr; Robert Carlyle; Angela Chadfield; Frank Gallagher
- Cinematography: Denis Crossan
- Edited by: Justin Krish
- Distributed by: BFI Production
- Release date: 1990
- Running time: 85 minutes
- Country: United Kingdom
- Language: English

Silent Scream is a 1990 biopic film about convicted murderer Larry Winters, in which Robert Carlyle made his film debut. It was directed by David Hayman.

== Plot ==
Based on a true story. Larry Winters was sentenced to life imprisonment for a murder in a Soho bar in London in 1963. Silent Scream, directed by David Hayman and starring Iain Glen as Winters, is based on the life and writing of Winters. A violent and drug addicted member of the Barlinnie Special Unit in Scotland, Larry died in 1977 of a drug overdose at the age of 34.

The film is composed of flashbacks into his younger life as a soldier in the parachute regiment and his childhood in Glasgow and Carbisdale. The memories are triggered by drugs and isolation.

Since the film deals primarily with the convict Winters, the viewer experiences his memories to the fullest. His life as a child, in which he is encouraged by his brother to do wrong, is captured in beautiful nostalgia. His life as a young man is beset with problems.

The encouragement from his older brother is clearly the cause of his dysfunction. Together the two commit crimes including robbery, breaking and entering, shooting and fighting. His older brother Don almost shoots Larry in the head by accident while playing with a World War II rifle stolen previously by Don. The childhood holidays in Carbisdale are fundamental to the biography of Winters. In his own writing he describes the times as his most peaceful. The adventures of the two boys feature heavily in the film.

His life in the Parachute regiment is captured with gritty realism. Content with messing about in the military, Winters soon becomes disenchanted with the army, takes part in a brutal beating of another soldier and goes AWOL. Before running off, the viewer witnesses his indecision to take the gun his older brother gave him. The gun which sent him to prison. His own internal battle with right and wrong is what drives the film. It becomes clear that he is gifted but unstable. A writer of poetry, Winters own work gave the film its name.

His memories of childhood are frequent but one stands out above the others. The two boys are being attacked by a Glasgow gang and Larry is cornered. His brother Don steps in to save him and gives Larry a glass bottle to fight with. Larry smashes it over the head of his adversary. This represents the beginning of his violence. Later, the two boys break into a mansion house and his brother Don finds a gun and some bullets. They run off and hide in the woods where they begin to play with the weapon. Don loads it and almost shoots Larry in the head.

Years later, after several years in prison, Larry has a home visit. Meeting with his older brother (now played by Alexander Morton) and his mother in the family home is one of the most upsetting recurring themes of the film.

== Cast ==
- Iain Glen: Larry Winters
- Angela Chadfield: Patricia
- Andrew Barr: Shuggie
- Robert Carlyle: Big Woodsy
- Julie Graham: Alice/Betty
- Harry Jones: Frank Winters
- Alexander Morton: Don Winters
- Jamie Morton: Young Don Winters
- Phil Bradley: Police Officer
- Michael McDonald: Young Larry Winters
- Denise McDonald: Young Larry Winters sister

== Awards ==
The film won several awards including the Silver Bear for Best Actor (Iain Glen) at the 40th Berlin International Film Festival, Best Film (Michael Powell British Film of the Year Award) at the Edinburgh International Film Festival, Scottish BAFTA (for Best Film) and Best Director (OCIC). It was nominated for the Golden Bear (Best Film Berlin Film Festival) and was called one of Scotland's finest films by the Time Magazine reviewer.
