= Sasha Luss =

Russian fashion model and actress

- Саша Лусс
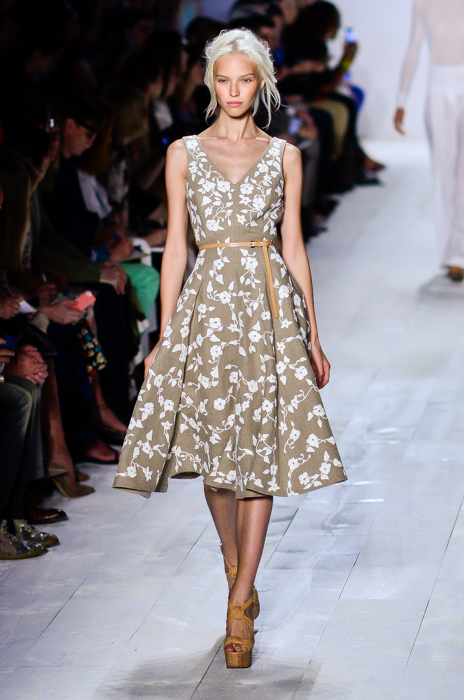
- Luss in 2013
- Born: Alexandra Alexeyevna Luss; 6 June 1992 (age 33); Magadan, Russia
- Occupations: Fashion model; actress
- Years active: 2008–present
- Modeling information
- Height: 178 cm (5 ft 10 in)
- Hair color: Blonde
- Eye color: Blue
- Agency: IMG Models (New York, Milan, London, Sydney); Elite Model Management (Paris, Copenhagen); Traffic Models (Barcelona); Iconic Management (Berlin); Mega Model Agency (Hamburg); Avant Models Agency (Moscow, Warsaw); MP Stockholm (Stockholm); Donna Models (Tokyo)

Aleksandra "Sasha" Alexeyevna Luss (Russian: Александра "Саша" Алексеевна Лусс; born 6 June 1992) is a Russian fashion model and actress best known for portraying the titular character in the 2019 action thriller film Anna.

== Early life ==
Luss was born in Magadan, Russia, and moved to Moscow at a young age. As a child, she had no interest in modelling, preferring to spend her time writing and dancing. She frequently participated in ballet competitions before an ankle injury ended her participation. Her mother's friends and even strangers would compliment Sasha's modelling potential. When Sasha was 13, her mother took her to visit a modelling agency, where she was signed. Luss has said her grandmother disapproved of this career move, calling modelling a terrible and immoral business.

== Career ==
=== Modelling ===
She signed with DNA Model Management, which flew her to Europe and New York, where she walked in fashion shows for designers such as DKNY and Antonio Marras. Despite these successful bookings, she returned to Russia to complete her education. Luss decided to sign with Elite Model Management in Paris and Women Management in Milan as a model and, in 2011, left her mother agency, IQ Models, to join Avant Models.

In 2011, Luss was spotted by Karl Lagerfeld in an advertisement for the Russian demi-couturier Bohemique. Lagerfeld was so impressed by her, he decided to cast her in his Chanel pre-Fall 2012 and Fall/Winter 2012 shows. The following season, she was snapped up by Dior to walk exclusively in their Spring/Summer 2013 show. She walked in 58 shows during the Autumn/Winter 2013 season for some of the world's most prestigious brands, such as Prada, Valentino, Calvin Klein, Louis Vuitton and Givenchy. She was selected as one of the top newcomers of the season by models.com. Following her impressive runway presence, she was chosen to star in ad campaigns for Carolina Herrera, Max Mara, Valentino and Tommy Hilfiger. Luss decided to bleach her hair platinum blonde, which was a significant moment in her career. Her new-found elven beauty was adored by designers and inspired other models to emulate her look. Luss walked in another 53 fashion shows during Spring/Summer 2014, cementing her position as one of the most in-demand models of the moment. She was awarded the honor "Model of the Year" by Glamour Russia in 2013.

She was photographed for Lanvin and Chanel by her long-time supporter Karl Lagerfeld for the fashion house's Spring/Summer 2014 ad campaigns. Shortly after this, Luss landed the biggest job of her career, as the new face of Dior Beauty. Luss starred in the 2014 Autumn Versace Jeans AD Campaign. She was selected by casting director Jennifer Starr for the Steven Meisel photographed 2015 Pirelli Calendar.

=== Film ===
In 2017, Luss played Princess Lihö-Minaa in the film Valerian and the City of a Thousand Planets. In 2019, she starred in the title role of the action thriller film Anna as a Russian agent who goes undercover as a model. In 2023, Luss co-starred in the action-adventure film Sheroes. In 2024, she starred in the action film The Last Front and the science fiction thriller film Latency.

She appears as Tovia in the film Depravity.

== Filmography ==
=== Film ===
Year	Title	Role
2017	Valerian and the City of a Thousand Planets	Princess Lihö-Minaa
2019	Anna	Anna Poliatova
2022	Shattered	Jamie Decker
2023	Sheroes	Diamond
2024	The Last Front	Louise
2024	Latency	Hana
2024	Depravity	Tovia
2026	Alicia in Wonderland	

=== Television ===
Year	Title	Role
TBA	Tomb Raider	TBA
