= Ilya Chaiken =

American film director and screenwriter

Ilya Chaiken (born February 10, 1973) is an American film director and screenwriter. She is best known for her debut feature Margarita Happy Hour, a film about motherhood, which premiered at the Sundance Film Festival in 2001 and went on to the Los Angeles Film Festival and Toronto International Film Festival.

Chaiken garnered accolades for her senior thesis, The Actress, and later film Match Flick. She was awarded a Statue Award for artistic excellence in film from the Princess Grace Foundation in 1994. She has worked as an editor on various shorts, music videos, as well as her own films. In 2004, her comedic short The 100 Lovers of Jesus Reynolds granted her a return to Sundance. That same year she also screened her short Blackout for the Blackout Film Festival, for the first anniversary of the blackout that occurred in New York in 2003.

Chaiken's second feature Liberty Kid, which deals with post-9/11 life for inner-city youth in Brooklyn, premiered at the 2007 Los Angeles Film Festival. It won the Best Feature Award at the New York International Latino Film Festival and was picked up for broadcasting by HBO. Producers included Mike S. Ryan, Larry Fessenden, and Roger E. Kass. It was released on video by Kino Films on Veteran's Day, 2008.

She is a graduate of SUNY Purchase in filmmaking.
