= Freedom of information in the United Kingdom =

UK legislation

Freedom of information (FOI) in the United Kingdom refers to members of the general public's right to access information held by public authorities. This right is covered in two parts:

1. Public authorities must regularly publish updates and information regarding their activities, and
2. Members of the public can make requests for information and updates regarding the activities of public authorities.

Under the governance of FOI in the UK, public authorities generally include organizations that are publicly funded: like the NHS, police and governmental departments, and state schools. However, public funding is not the final arbiter of whether an organization must comply with FOI rules, as certain publicly funded but privately held operations (like grant receiving charities) are exempt. Healthcare and dental practices only have to make accessible information for the work they perform under the NHS (where it does not reveal personal data).

Information made public under FOI rules include written documents (letters, emails, computer files) or recordings (photos, videos, phone calls). Requests for information can be made by anyone, whether or not they are citizens of, or live in, the UK.

Freedom of information is philosophically based on the idea that more openness leads to more trust between members of the public and public authorities. Because of this, FOI policy in the UK favors access rather than restriction of information. To support access, no one has to give a reason why they want the information they are requesting. And, all requests should be responded to equally. Journalists, students, and voters should be responded to with the same level of information.

== Legislation ==
Freedom of information legislation in the United Kingdom is controlled by two acts of the United Kingdom and Scottish Parliaments, which both came into force on 1 January 2005.

- Freedom of Information Act 2000 (the "2000 Act")
- Freedom of Information (Scotland) Act 2002 ("the 2002 Act" or "the Scottish Act")

As many public bodies in Scotland (for example, educational bodies) are controlled by the Scottish Parliament, the 2000 Act would not apply to them, and thus a second Act of the Scottish Parliament was required. The acts are very similar but not identical - the types of public bodies covered in England, Wales and Northern Ireland are also covered in Scotland - and the requirements are similar, though the Scottish Act has slightly stronger phrasing in favour of disclosing information.

The 2000 act does not extend to public bodies in the overseas territories or crown dependencies. Some of these have contemplated implementing their own legislation, though none is currently in force.

In the United Kingdom, FOI access is treated as a separate issue from access to environmental information. Certain information can only be obtained under the Environmental Information Regulations 2004. This includes information on environmental policies and legislation, environmental damage and climate change incidents, and occasions where humans' health and safety are impacted by the environment.

== Freedom of information fulfilment ==
To meet the first of the two requirements of freedom of information in the UK, outlining regular publication of information by public authorities, the law calls for organizations to develop publication schemes. These publication schedules determine when and where information is made available to the public, without anyone specifically needing to make requests. This process falls under the principle of proactive disclosure. One such example of a publication scheme is the one shared by the National Archives (United Kingdom). On their website, they give information on topics including their funding and spending as well as their organizational strategic planning. As a publicly funded institution, these information disclosures allow taxpayers to be better informed on the actions of their national archive.

The second part of freedom of information policy in the UK, about inquiries made by members of the public, is fulfilled by FOI requests. All FOI requests must be submitted in a written form: such as an email or letter, or by a form on an organization/department's website. There are provisions in place for individuals who cannot write out their requests. Requests should include both information about the requester (name, contact details) and a description of the desired information (what is being asked for, and how it needs to be delivered – paper or e-copies). While there may be no fee for submitting a freedom of information request, institutions can charge a small price for things like copying. Typical turnaround time is twenty working days from submitting the request.

== Accessing information ==
Individuals make their freedom of information requests and then receive the information from the public authority they are requesting from, by written notice in a set amount of time. Because of the large number of information requests submitted, organizations will publish the answered information on the internet – in a disclosure log. This process saves time for both public offices and FOI requesters. If the information has been requested previously there is no need for the process to be carried out a second time. Once information is shared with the public via FOI policy, it becomes available to anyone at any time.

== Restrictions ==
Despite freedom of information being based on an established right to know, there are limitations to FOI access.

Freedom of information in the UK can be restricted for two reasons:

1. The type of information is classified (such as personally identifiable information, like information regarding an individual person's health, or international relations/defense information),
2. Fulfilling the FOI request would be unreasonably difficult (either for cost reasons or because the request was made too many times).

Also, freedom of information only covers things that exist in recorded form. If it is not written or otherwise captured outside of someone's head, the request for information does not need to be fulfilled by an organization. Public authorities are not required under FOI law to write down information after receiving a request, for the sole purpose of fulfilling said request. Information in the process of future publication is exempt from FOI requirements.

Information on commercial business, trade, or research is also not available under FOI.

A public authority must explain why they are refusing a FOI request, and a requester has the right to make an appeal. This appellate process is the duty of the Information Commissioner's Office (in both the UK broadly, and through the Scottish Information Commissioner for Scotland specifically).

== History ==
FOI legislation in the UK is the result of a series of incremental reforms. The 1966 Fulton report recommended the elimination of 'unnecessary secrecy.' The 1974 Labour manifesto promised a future FOI Act and the repeal of the 1911 Official Secrets Act.

In 1977, a draft "Freedom of Information and Privacy Bill" was circulated; this was shorter and simpler than the later Acts, and also included privacy legislation. Later versions were occasionally suggested by opposition parties, and it became a manifesto commitment for the Labour Party at the 1997 general election. This promised to introduce some form of freedom of information legislation in line with other western nations.

A schedule for compliance was arranged at the time of the 2000 Act, and then for the 2002 Act, with timescales arranged so that both would come into full force on the same date - 1 January 2005. This reduced confusion and ambiguities, but the delay in passing an Act in Scotland pushed back the final implementation by some time. As a result, a manifesto promise from the 1997 election was finally fulfilled just in time for the 2005 election.

In 2007, the Freedom of Information (Amendment) Bill was introduced as a private members bill in the House of the Commons by the Conservative MP David Maclean. The bill proposed to exempt MPs and Peers from the provisions of the 2000 Act, but whilst it successfully completed its passage in the Commons, it failed to progress through the House of Lords after failing to find a sponsor.

In 2010, the Constitutional Reform and Governance Act 2010 was established. This reform act was focused part of a broader set of reforms aimed at modernizing the UK's constitutional framework. The Constitutional Reform and Governance Act 2010, often referred to as the CRAG Act, was a piece of legislation that further shaped how the UK government functions and its transparency. Since the UK doesn't have a written constitution, it has previously relied on legacy traditions, established practices, and a collection of statutes. So, when this act was established, it was a big deal.

In 2020, Scottish Government moves to include restrictions on Freedom of Information laws as part of COVID-19 emergency legislation proved controversial and were eventually rolled back after strong cross party opposition.

In 2020, the openDemocracy website published a report on the FOI Clearing House. The report described the Clearing House as "Orwellian" and found that it requires government departments to send it requests that are potentially sensitive or too expensive to answer. The report also found that the Clearing House sometimes requires departments to provide it with drafts of responses to FOI requests for vetting. According to the report, government ministers were hindering FOI requests in "disturbing" ways and the number of FOI requests granted by departments had decreased. The Cabinet Office said the Clearing House was designed to "ensur[e] there is a standard approach across government in the way we consider and respond to requests".

== See also ==
- Freedom of information legislation
- Campaign for Freedom of Information
- Information Commissioner's Office
- Scottish Information Commissioner
