= Iain Glen =

Scottish actor (born 1961)

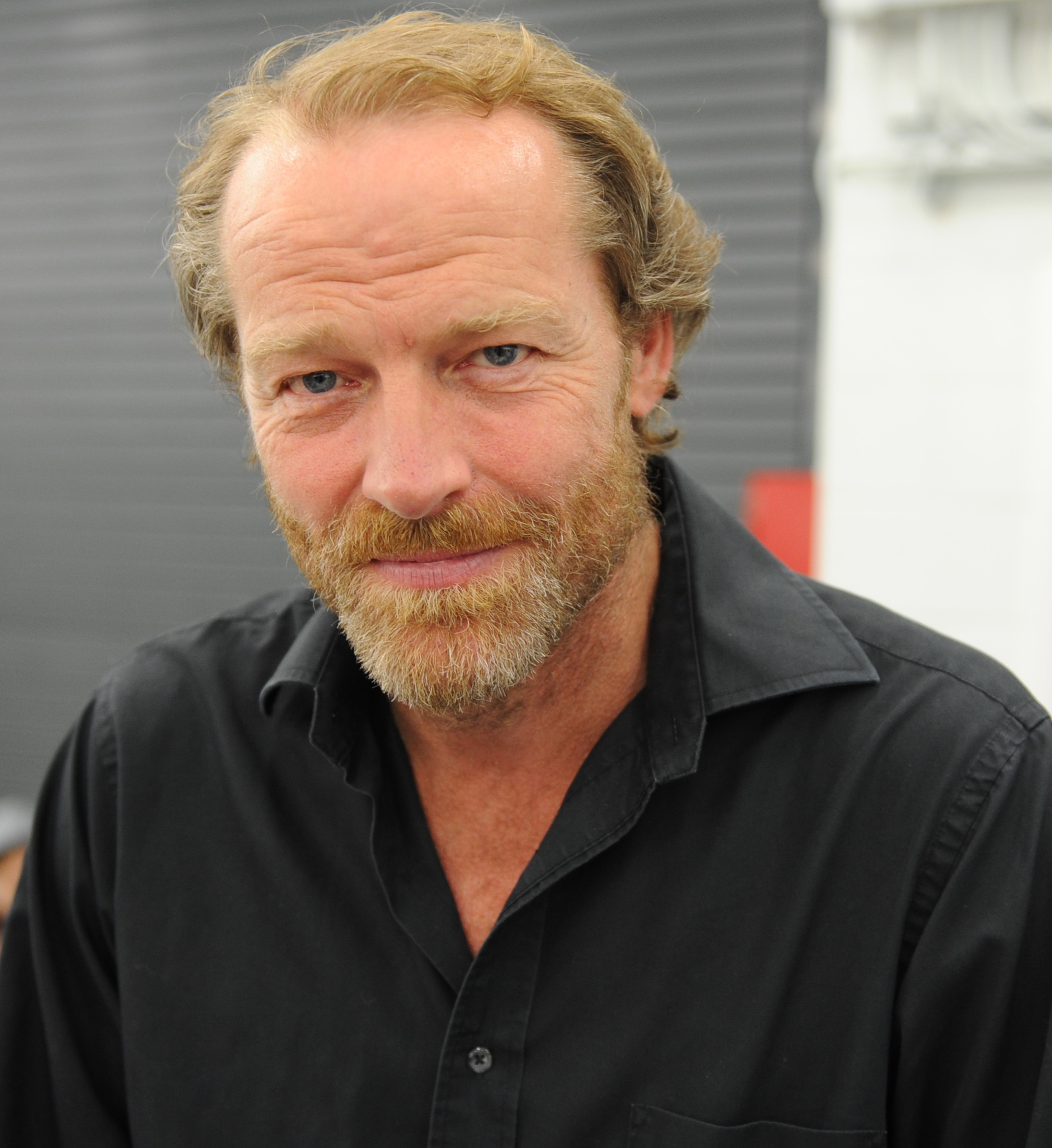
- Glen in 2012
- Born: Iain Alan Sutherland Glen; 24 June 1961 (age 65); Edinburgh, Scotland
- Education: University of Aberdeen (BA); Royal Academy of Dramatic Art (GrDip)
- Occupation: Actor
- Years active: 1986–present
- Spouses: Susannah Harker (m. 1993; div. 2004) Charlotte Emmerson (m. 2017)
- Children: 3

Iain Alan Sutherland Glen (born 24 June 1961) is a Scottish actor. He has appeared as Dr. Alexander Isaacs/Tyrant in three films of the Resident Evil film series (2004–2016) and as Jorah Mormont in the HBO fantasy television series Game of Thrones (2011–2019). Other notable film and television roles include John Hanning Speke in Mountains of the Moon (1990), Larry Winters in Silent Scream (1990) for which he won the Silver Bear for Best Actor at the Berlin International Film Festival, Manfred Powell in Lara Croft: Tomb Raider (2001), Brother John in Song for a Raggy Boy (2003), the title role in Jack Taylor (2010–2016), Sir Richard Carlisle in Downton Abbey (2011), James Willett in Eye in the Sky (2015), Bruce Wayne in Titans (2019–2021), Magnus MacMillan in The Rig (2023–present), and Dr. Pete Nichols in Silo (2023–2025).

An accomplished stage actor, Glen has acted in a wide array of theatre including playing the titular roles in Shakespeare productions including Hamlet, Macbeth and Henry V. He received three Laurence Olivier Award nominations for his performances in the original production of the musical Martin Guerre, the West End production of The Blue Room and the 2006 West End revival of The Crucible, portraying John Proctor.

== Early life and education ==
Glen was born on 24 June 1961 in Edinburgh, Scotland, and educated at the Edinburgh Academy, an independent school for boys (now co-educational), followed by the University of Aberdeen. He then trained in acting at the RADA in London, because it was the only drama school holding auditions at that moment. He graduated in 1985 with an Acting (RADA) Diploma, having won the Bancroft Gold Medal. His older brother is Hamish Glen, artistic director of the Belgrade Theatre, Coventry and former artistic director of the Dundee Repertory Theatre.

== Career ==
Glen's big screen debut came in the 1988 film Paris by Night, alongside Charlotte Rampling and Michael Gambon. The same year, Glen appeared in Gorillas in the Mist with Sigourney Weaver. In 1990, Glen won the Silver Bear for Best Actor at the 40th Berlin International Film Festival for his role in Silent Scream. That year he was cast as Hamlet, Prince of Denmark, in Tom Stoppard's film adaptation of his play Rosencrantz and Guildenstern Are Dead, which won the Golden Lion at the Venice Film Festival.

In 1998, Glen was nominated for the Laurence Olivier Award for Best Actor for his performance in The Blue Room starring opposite Nicole Kidman.

In 2002, Glen starred with Emilia Fox in the Italian-French-British romance-drama film The Soul Keeper, directed by Roberto Faenza. In 2008, Glen was Samson in the BBC Radio 3 production of Samson Agonistes directed by John Tydeman.

Glen starred as John Fielding in the 2008 British TV mini-series City of Vice. Ian McDiarmid plays Henry Fielding (author of the novel Tom Jones) who along with his brother, John, started London's first professional police force.

In 2009, it was announced that Glen had joined the cast of the HBO series Game of Thrones, starring as Ser Jorah Mormont, a knight in exile from Westeros, who becomes adviser to Daenerys Targaryen (played by Emilia Clarke) when she joins the Dothraki.

In 2010, he played the role of Father Octavian, leader of a sect of clerics who were on a mission against the Weeping Angels in "The Time of Angels" and "Flesh and Stone", a two-episode story which formed part of the fifth season of the revived television series Doctor Who (played by Matt Smith). He appeared in the second series of Downton Abbey as Sir Richard Carlisle, a tabloid publisher who is a suitor to, and subsequently engaged to, Lady Mary.

From 2010 to 2016, Glen played the title character in the Irish TV crime series Jack Taylor, adapted from the novels by Ken Bruen, and set in Galway, Ireland.

In the 2012 BBC drama series Prisoners' Wives, he plays Paul, the husband of Francesca, whose comfortable life comes crashing down when he is imprisoned for drug trafficking. The same year, he starred in a new four-part BBC Radio 4 adaptation of The Count of Monte Cristo, written by Sebastian Baczkiewicz, and directed by Jeremy Mortimer and Sasha Yevtushenko.

From December 2013 until early January 2014, Glen starred alongside Richard McCabe in Fortune's Fool at the Old Vic, directed by Lucy Bailey. He had been due to appear in the full run until late February 2014, but was forced to withdraw early to recover from illness, with his role taken by his understudy Patrick Cremin and then by William Houston, who joined the cast at around the same time as Glen's departure.

In 2019, it was revealed that Glen would be portraying Bruce Wayne on the DC Universe TV series Titans.

In 2023, Glen starred as Magnus MacMillan, in charge of the Kinloch Bravo oil rig in The Rig, in a cast that included Emily Hampshire, Martin Compston and Mark Addy. The same year, he starred as William Carr in Operation Napoleon, a thriller directed by Óskar Þór Axelsson and based on Arnaldur Indriðason's best selling book of the same name.

Glen plays Leonard in the Belgian film The Last Front, a story about a broken man who takes a stand during the First World War.

Glen has received numerous nominations and awards for his performance in Game of Thrones. Notably, he won the Best Actor award at the 2016 Taormina Film Fest.

== Personal life ==
Glen lives in south London with his wife and three children.

He is a keen cricketer, and has played for the Actors XI.

== Filmography ==
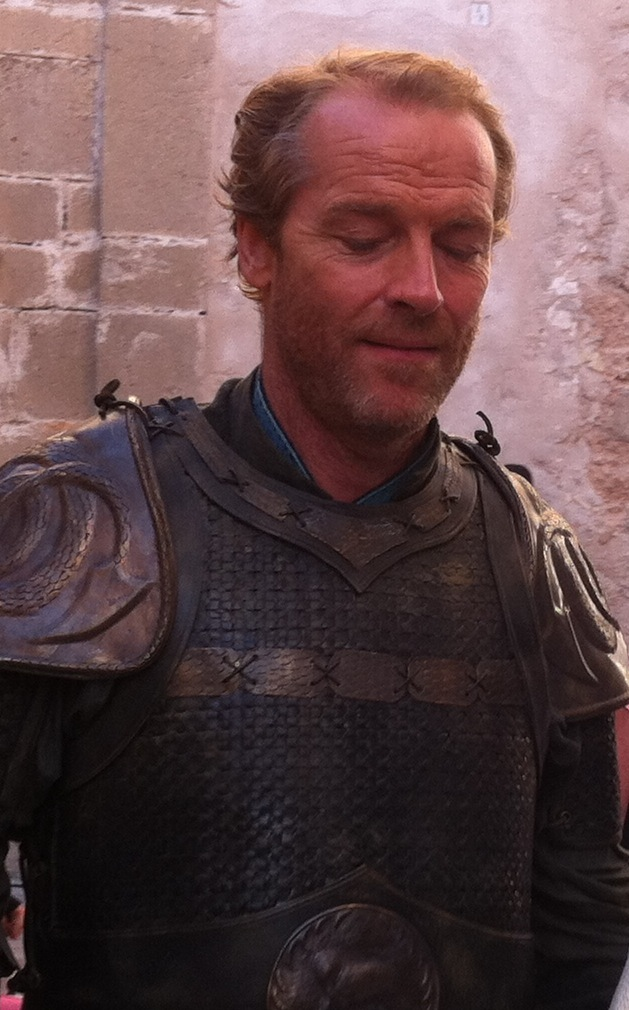
Iain Glen as Ser Jorah Mormont on the set of Game of Thrones

Key
†	Denotes works that have not yet been released

=== Film ===
Year	Title	Role	Notes
1988	Paris by Night	Wallace Sharp	
1988	Gorillas in the Mist	Brendan	
1990	Mountains of the Moon	John Hanning Speke	
1990	Silent Scream	Larry Winters	
1990	Rosencrantz and Guildenstern Are Dead	Hamlet	
1990	Fools of Fortune	William Quinton	
1991	30 Door Key	Joey	
1993	The Young Americans	Edward Foster	
1998	Mararía	Bertrand	
2000	Beautiful Creatures	Tony	
2000	Paranoid	Stan	
2001	Lara Croft: Tomb Raider	Manfred Powell	
2001	Gabriel & Me	Dad	
2002	Darkness	Mark	
2002	The Soul Keeper	Dr. Carl Gustav Jung	
2003	Song for a Raggy Boy	Brother John	
2003	Spy Sorge	Richard Sorge	
2004	Resident Evil: Apocalypse	Dr. Alexander Isaacs	
2005	Man to Man	Alexander Auchinleck	
2005	Vagabond Shoes	Alec Murray	Short film
2005	Tara Road	Danny	
2005	Kingdom of Heaven	Richard Cœur de Lion	
2006	Small Engine Repair	Doug	
2007	The Last Legion	Orestes	
2007	Resident Evil: Extinction	Dr. Alexander Isaacs / Tyrant	
2007	Mrs Ratcliffe's Revolution	Frank Ratcliffe	
2008	Slapper	Red / Michael Simmons	Short film
2009	Pope Joan	Village Priest	
2009	Harry Brown	S.I. Childs	
2009	The Case of Unfaithful Klara	Denis	
2011	The Iron Lady	Alfred Roberts	
2013	Kick-Ass 2	Uncle Ralph	
2014	Guy Martin's Spitfire	Narrator (voice)	Documentary
2014	Monsters Behind the Iron Curtain	Narrator (voice)	Documentary
2015	The Bad Education Movie	Pasco	
2015	Eye in the Sky	James Willett	
2016	Resident Evil: The Final Chapter	Dr. Alexander Isaacs	
2016	Dusty and Me	Mickey the Bubble	
2017	My Cousin Rachel	Nick Kendall	
2019	The Flood	Philip	
2019	The Fabric of You	Isaac (voice)	Short film
2019	Isabel	Colin	Short film
2020	The Windermere Children	Jock Lawrence	
2020	The Racer	Sonny	
2020	Black Beauty	John Manly	
2021	Tides	Gibson	
2022	The Lost Girls	Hook	
2023	Operation Napoleon	William Carr	
2024	The Last Front	Leonard	
2024	What About Love	American Ambassador	
2025	Tanvi The Great	Michael Simmons	
2025	Quezon	Leonard Wood	
2026	Drummer Boy	John Ambrose	
2026	1971 †		
TBA	Black Palace †	—N/a	Post-production

=== Television ===
Year	Title	Role	Notes
1986	Taggart	Scott Adair	Episode: "Knife Edge"
1986–1989	Screen Two	Allan Innes / Sailor / Ray	3 episodes
1988	The Fear	Carl Galton	5 episodes
1991	Adam Bede	Adam Bede	Television film
1992	Frankie's House	Tim Page	4 episodes
1992	Screen One	Cmdr Powell	Episode: "Black and Blue"
1993	Missus	Father Pietro Salviati, Missus	Television film
1996	Death of a Salesman	Biff	Television film
1997	Painted Lady	Sebastian Stafford	2 episodes
1998	Trial & Retribution	Damon Morton	2 episodes
1999	Wives and Daughters	Mr. Preston	4 episodes
2000	Glasgow Kiss	Stuart Morrison	6 episodes
2000	The Wyvern Mystery	Charles Fairfield	Television film
2000	Anchor Me	Nathan Carter	Television film
2002	Impact	Marcus Hodge	Television film
2003	Carla	Daniel	Television film
2005	Kidnapped	Alan Breck	2 episodes
2007	Starting Over	Gregor Dewhurst	Television film
2007	The Relief of Belsen	James Johnston	Television film
2008	City of Vice	John Fielding	5 episodes
2009	The Diary of Anne Frank	Otto Frank	5 episodes
2009	Law & Order: UK	Luke Slade	Episode: "Unsafe"
2009	Into the Storm	King George VI	Television film
2010	Doctor Who	Father Octavian	2 episodes
2010	Spooks	Vaughn Edwards	8 episodes
2010–2016	Jack Taylor	Jack Taylor	Series of television films
2011	Strike Back: Project Dawn	Crawford	2 episodes
2011	Downton Abbey	Sir Richard Carlisle	6 episodes
2011–2019	Game of Thrones	Ser Jorah Mormont	52 episodes
2012	Haven	Roland Holloway	Episode: "Real Estate"
2012	The Hollow Crown	Earl of Warwick	Episode: Henry IV, Part II
2012–2013	Prisoners' Wives	Paul	10 episodes
2013	Borgia	Girolamo Savonarola	2 episodes
2013	Ripper Street	Colonel Madoc Faulkner	Episode: "The Weight of One Man's Heart"
2013	Agatha Christie's Poirot	Dr. David Willoughby	Episode: "Elephants Can Remember"
2013	Breathless	Inspector Ronald Mulligan	6 episodes
2014	The Red Tent	Jacob	2 episodes
2014–2017	Autopsy: The Last Hours of...	Narrator (voice)	10 episodes
2016–2017	Cleverman	Jarrod Slade	12 episodes
2016–2019	Delicious	Leo	12 episodes
2018	The Sidemen Show	Narrator (voice)	7 episodes
2018	Mrs Wilson	Alexander "Alec" Wilson	3 episodes
2019	Ice Age: Return of the Mammoth	Narrator (voice)	Television documentary
2019–2021	Titans	Bruce Wayne	11 episodes
2021–present	Reyka	Angus Speelman	8 episodes
2023–2025	The Rig	Magnus MacMillan	12 episodes
2023–2025	Castlevania: Nocturne	Juste Belmont (voice)	9 episodes
2023–present	Silo	Dr. Pete Nichols	12 episodes
2026	Agatha Christie's Seven Dials	Lord Caterham	2 episodes

== Selected theatre ==
- Edward II, Royal Exchange, Manchester 1986
- The Man Who Had All the Luck Bristol Old Vic 1990
- Hamlet, Bristol Old Vic, 1991
- Macbeth (1993)
- Henry V (1995)
- Martin Guerre (1996–1997)
- The Blue Room (1998)
- A Streetcar Named Desire (2002)
- Hedda Gabler (2005)
- The Crucible (2006)
- Scenes of a Marriage (2008)
- Wallenstein (2009, Minerva Theatre, Chichester) – title role
- Separate Tables (2009) – roles of Mr Martin and Major Pollock – Chichester Festival Theatre
- Ghosts (2010) – also directed
- Uncle Vanya, The Print Room, 2012 – title role
- Fortune's Fool, The Old Vic, 2013
- The Seagull
- Here
- King Lear
- Coriolanus
- She Stoops to Conquer
- Hapgood
- Road
- Small Engine Repair
- The Recruiting Officer
- Love From A Stranger

== Awards and nominations ==
Year	Award	Category	Work	Result
1990	Silver Bear	Best Actor	Silent Scream	Won
1991	Evening Standard British Film Award	Best Actor	Mountains of the Moon, Fools of Fortune, Silent Scream	Won
1991	Ian Charleson Award	Special commendation	Hamlet	Won
1994	Evening Standard Theatre Award	Best Actor	Henry V	Nominated
1997	Laurence Olivier Award	Best Actor in a Musical	Martin Guerre	Nominated
1999	Laurence Olivier Award	Best Actor	The Blue Room	Nominated
1999	Drama League Award	Best Actor	The Blue Room	Nominated
2007	Whatsonstage.com Award	Best Actor	The Crucible	Nominated
2007	Laurence Olivier Award	Best Actor	The Crucible	Nominated
2012	Screen Actors Guild Award	Outstanding Performance by an Ensemble in a Drama Series	Game of Thrones	Nominated
2013	Screen Actors Guild Award	Outstanding Performance by an Ensemble in a Drama Series	Game of Thrones	Nominated
2013	Screen Actors Guild Award	Outstanding Performance by an Ensemble in a Drama Series	Downton Abbey	Won
2014	Screen Actors Guild Award	Outstanding Performance by an Ensemble in a Drama Series	Game of Thrones	Nominated
2015	Screen Actors Guild Award	Outstanding Performance by an Ensemble in a Drama Series	Game of Thrones	Nominated
2016	Screen Actors Guild Award	Outstanding Performance by an Ensemble in a Drama Series	Game of Thrones	Nominated
2018	Screen Actors Guild Award	Outstanding Performance by an Ensemble in a Drama Series	Game of Thrones	Nominated
2020	Screen Actors Guild Award	Outstanding Performance by an Ensemble in a Drama Series	Game of Thrones	Nominated
2016	Taormina Film Fest	Best Actor	Game of Thrones	Won
2019	IGN Summer Movie Awards	Best TV Ensemble	Game of Thrones	Won
2021	Almeria Film Festival	Land of Cinema Award	N/A (Lifetime Award)	Won
