= Sheroes =

2023 American action adventure film

- Release poster
- Directed by: Jordan Gertner
- Written by: Jordan Gertner
- Produced by: Jordan Gertner; Scott Clayton; Tara L. Craig; Wych Kaos; Gary Hirsch; Josie Ho; Conroy Chan
- Starring: Sasha Luss; Wallis Day; Isabelle Fuhrman; Skai Jackson
- Music by: Hendric Buenck; Skid Robot
- Distributed by: Paramount Global Content Distribution Group
- Release date: June 23, 2023
- Running time: 91 minutes
- Country: United States
- Language: English

Sheroes is a 2023 American action adventure film written and directed by Jordan Gertner and starring Sasha Luss, Wallis Day, Isabelle Fuhrman and Skai Jackson. It is Gertner's feature directorial debut.

== Plot ==
Rich heiress Diamond surprises her three best friends – adrenaline junkie Ryder, struggling actress Ezra, and independent art curator Daisy – by revealing that her father has agreed to let them borrow his jet and vacation estate in Thailand for a girls' trip. While flying across the ocean, Diamond spends some time with their pilot, Jasper, and the two find themselves instantly attracted to each other.

Not long after they settle in, the girls head out on the town, but quickly run into trouble when strange men accost Daisy and start threatening her with a gun. Jasper suddenly appears, disarms the thugs, and chases them off. He refuses to explain his skills, instead asking the group to contact him again if they have any further trouble.

That night, Ryder realizes that the bag she has is not hers; instead, it contains multiple parcels of cocaine. At Daisy's suggestion, the group decides to open one and snort the contents, leading to a wild night of debauchery. The next morning, they wake up to find Daisy missing and a message painted on the walls demanding that the cocaine be returned in exchange for her life.

The cocaine, as it turns out, belongs to Khon, a powerful warlord and drug trafficker operating out of the Golden Triangle. Diamond, deciding that they cannot trust the authorities to help, unlocks a safe room in the estate filled with emergency supplies and weapons. Under her instruction, the girls become adept shooters. Khon's lieutenant Spyder then makes contact with them, agreeing to trade Daisy at a remote location for the bag.

The girls stage an elaborate rescue attempt to save their friend, but the plan quickly goes pear-shaped, and they lose both Daisy and the bag. Back at the estate, Diamond watches a news programme and learns that Khon is hosting a Muay Thai tournament. She comes up with a new plan, admitting to her friends that she had anticipated their failure.

At the tournament, Ryder enters as a participant with Diamond placing a large bet on her to win. She manages to seduce Khon and lure him into an empty room, where he is tranquilized with crushed sleeping pills. Diamond then pretends to storm out with Ryder, while Ezra disguises herself as Khon (having made a latex mask of his face from one of Diamond's dresses) and provides them with a distraction. Back in their car, the girls reveal the real Khon stuffed in the trunk.

Locked in the safe room, Khon refuses to tell the girls where Daisy is being held. Armed men show up to rescue him but are then quickly subdued by Jasper. When Diamond holds him at gunpoint, Jasper confesses that he is actually an undercover DEA agent. It turns out that the usual pilot of her father's jet is a smuggler working with Khon's operation, explaining how the girls got their hands on one of his shipments.

Given 24 hours to locate Daisy before the DEA gets involved, Ryder uses the threat of castration to make Khon give up Daisy's location: a camp deep in the jungle. They leave their prisoner tied up for Jasper and arm themselves with explosives from the safe house, blowing up the camp, freeing Daisy, and stealing a jeep, which they use to escape and head towards their jet.

Spyder and his remaining men catch up but are intercepted and taken into custody by the DEA. Jasper gets permission to personally fly them back to the United States, and gives the girls drinks to toast their victory as the film ends.

== Cast ==
- Isabelle Fuhrman as Ezra
- Sasha Luss as Diamond
- Wallis Day as Ryder
- Skai Jackson as Daisy
- Jack Kesy as Jasper

== Production ==
In January 2022, it was announced that Fuhrman was cast in the film. In March 2022, it was announced that Paramount Worldwide Acquisition Group acquired the worldwide distribution rights to the film and that filming wrapped in Thailand. According to Gertner: "The script had been written for actually another location, and a group of people I was working with suggested Thailand..."

== Release ==
The film was released in select theaters and on digital on June 23, 2023.

== Reception ==
The film has a 40% rating on Rotten Tomatoes based on five reviews. Carla Renata of RogerEbert.com awarded the film two stars. Tara McNamara of Common Sense Media awarded the film one star out of five.

Jon Mendelsohn of Comic Book Resources gave the film a positive review and wrote, "Sheroes has committed performers and a frenetic style, but the story is derivative and goes nowhere fast."
