= Anna (2019 feature film) =

2019 film by Luc Besson

- Theatrical release poster
- Directed by: Luc Besson
- Written by: Luc Besson
- Produced by: Luc Besson; Marc Shmuger
- Starring: Sasha Luss; Luke Evans; Cillian Murphy; Helen Mirren
- Cinematography: Thierry Arbogast
- Edited by: Julien Rey
- Music by: Eric Serra
- Production companies: Summit Entertainment; EuropaCorp; TF1 Films Production; Canal+; TF1; OCS; TMC
- Distributed by: Lionsgate (International); Pathé Distribution (France)
- Release dates: 21 June 2019 (US); 10 July 2019 (France)
- Running time: 119 minutes
- Countries: France; United States
- Languages: English; Russian
- Budget: $30 million
- Box office: $32.8 million

Anna (stylized as ANИA) is a 2019 action thriller film written, produced and directed by Luc Besson. The film stars Sasha Luss as the eponymous assassin, alongside Luke Evans, Cillian Murphy, Helen Mirren, and Alexander Petrov.

The French production was theatrically released in the United States on 21 June 2019 by Summit Entertainment and on 10 July 2019 by Pathé Distribution in France. It received mixed reviews from critics and grossed $32 million worldwide against a $30 million budget.

== Plot ==
In 1990, Anna, a young Russian woman and victim of domestic abuse, will do anything to escape the life she is trapped in. A KGB agent, Alex, discovers Anna's predicament and recruits her as a field agent. After a year of training, she is told that for the next four years, she will work under senior handler Olga; once the five years in total are up, she will be discharged from the agency and can start her life over again. After the collapse of the Soviet Union, the director of the newly renamed SVR-RF, Vassiliev, refuses to honor the original agreement; because he believes that the only path to retirement is death.

Anna assumes the identity of a fashion model and starts a professional career in Paris, while completing various missions and assassinations. To avoid suspicion, she enters a lesbian relationship with fellow model Maude, with the permission of Olga. When the CIA uncovers her true identity, she agrees to work for them as a double agent with Agent Leonard Miller as her handler, in exchange for the promise of political asylum and a new life in Hawaii. Miller tasks her with assassinating the anti-American Vassiliev, as the CIA believes that whomever succeeds him will improve U.S.-Russian relations. Anna kills Vassiliev while the two play a game of chess and proceeds to shoot her way out of the Lubyanka Building.

She then arranges a meeting with both Alex and Miller, returning information to each that she had previously stolen, but insinuating that a copy had been kept and would be released if anything happened to her. Alex tells her that the information will be stale and worthless in 6 months, but Anna responds that 6 months of freedom was more than she had ever experienced before. Miller and Alex both accept the return of their data, and Miller agrees to allow Anna to disappear for as long as she can, though Alex is reluctant. The meeting area is under surveillance and Olga watches the meeting occur. Shortly after Anna leaves the meeting, Olga catches up to her and shoots her dead for betraying the Russian Federation. Miller and Alex hold each other at gunpoint, with Alex refusing to let Miller help Anna before both men are forced to retreat. Miller then attempts to get video proof that Anna is still alive, but her body is quickly collected by medical personnel before he can do so. It turns out that "Anna" is a body double; the real Anna slips into the sewers, changes her clothes, and removes the wig from her shaved head before vanishing into the shadows.

It is revealed that Olga had earlier revealed to Anna her knowledge of the CIA's planned assassination of Vassiliev. Both women conspired to go along with the CIA's plan as Olga wanted to take Vassiliev's place. As Olga moves into Vassiliev's former office, she views a recorded message left for her by Anna, who expresses her gratitude to Olga but reveals she kept evidence of Olga's involvement in Vassiliev's murder in case her old handler ever betrays their agreement. Olga smiles in admiration and proceeds to delete Anna's file from the SVR's official database.

== Cast ==
- Sasha Luss as Anna Poliatova
- Helen Mirren as Olga
- Luke Evans as Aleksander "Alex" Tchenkov
- Cillian Murphy as Leonard Miller
- Lera Abova as Maude
- Alexander Petrov as Piotr
- Nikita Pavlenko as Vlad
- Anna Krippa as Nika
- Aleksey Maslodudov as Jimmy
- Eric Godon as Vassiliev
- Ivan Franěk as Mossan
- Jean-Baptiste Puech as Samy
- Nastya Sten as Fake Anna
- Andrew Howard as Oleg Filenkov

== Production ==
On 9 October 2017, it was reported that Luc Besson's next film would be Anna, starring newcomer Sasha Luss, along with Helen Mirren, Luke Evans, and Cillian Murphy. EuropaCorp produced the film while Lionsgate handled the distribution under their Summit Entertainment label.

Principal photography on the film began in early November 2017 in Belgrade. Other locations were Paris, Moscow, Milan and Guadeloupe.

== Soundtrack ==
Summit Entertainment released the original soundtrack composed by Éric Serra on 19 July 2019. The film also features additional music not included in the soundtrack.

== Release ==
The film was released in the United States on 21 June 2019. It was released on Digital HD on 10 September 2019 and on DVD, Blu-ray, and Ultra HD Blu-ray on 24 September 2019.

== Reception ==
=== Box office ===
Anna grossed $7.7 million in the United States and Canada, and $25.1 million in other territories, for a worldwide total of $32.8 million.

In the United States and Canada, the film opened alongside Child's Play and Toy Story 4, and was expected to gross $2–4 million from 2,150 theaters in its opening weekend. It made $1.4 million on its first day, including $325,000 from Thursday night previews. It went on to debut to $3.5 million, finishing 11th at the box office.

=== Critical response ===
On Rotten Tomatoes, the film holds an approval rating of 34% based on 71 reviews, with an average rating of 4.9/10. The site's critical consensus reads, "Anna finds writer-director Luc Besson squarely in his wheelhouse, but fans of this variety of stylized action have seen it all done before – and better." Metacritic, which uses a weighted average, assigned the film a score of 40 out of 100, based on 14 critics, indicating "mixed or average" reviews. Audiences polled by CinemaScore gave the film an average grade of "B+" on an A+ to F scale, while those at PostTrak gave it an overall positive score of 81% (with an average 4 out of 5 stars).

Peter Debruge of Variety wrote, "Anna shows that Besson is the same filmmaker now that he was 20 years ago, and unlike his title character, who lithely adapts to whatever situation she's in, he's been telling roughly the same story over and over all this time."

Brad Wheeler of The Globe and Mail called the film "a near-parody non-thriller" and was critical of the story structure: "Anna relies on a time-shifting structure that is laughably exhausting."

Movie Nation critic Roger Moore gave the film one and a half out of four stars, and wrote: "There are a lot of irritants and clumsy touches to Besson's latest, infuriatingly inferior version of La Femme Nikita that ruin it." Moore criticized the "pointless flashbacks" and the cartoon physics of the fight scenes, though he praised Luss, writing that she "handles the action choreography with skill and emotes better than your average model turned actress".

Noel Murray of the Los Angeles Times praised the film, "As a slick, over-the-top action picture, Anna works splendidly" but says the film is overshadowed by Besson's offscreen personal issues.

David Fear of Rolling Stone stated, "This kind of Cold War-a-go-go, deadly-honeypot intrigue is harder to do well than you might think – just ask the folks behind Red Sparrow. So you appreciate it when someone like Besson can make it move like a pro. And despite constantly playing fast and loose with the chronology [...], he delivers a sleek, largely efficient mechanism of adrenaline-soaked déjà vu."

Bilge Ebiri of The New York Times wrote: "Anna isn't as stylish or gripping as Nikita, but it does have its own demented charm, particularly in how it toys with structure, nesting competing narrative timelines within each other."
