= Depravity (film) =

2024 American thriller film

- Release poster
- Directed by: Paul Tamasy
- Written by: Paul Tamasy
- Produced by: Paul Tamasy; Dorothy Aufiero; Jordan Gertner; Scott Clayton; Wych Kaosayananda; Gary A. Hirsch
- Starring: Victoria Justice; Devon Ross; Taylor John Smith; Sasha Luss; Dermot Mulroney
- Music by: Joseph Metcalfe
- Production company: Baang Rig Studios
- Distributed by: Paramount Global Content Distribution
- Release date: October 15, 2024
- Running time: 112 minutes
- Country: United States
- Language: English

Depravity is a 2024 American crime mystery thriller film written and directed by Paul Tamasy (in his feature directorial debut). It stars Victoria Justice, Devon Ross, Taylor John Smith, Sasha Luss and Dermot Mulroney.

== Plot ==
A group of tenants who suspect that their neighbor is a serial killer, stumble upon an art heist worth millions.

== Cast ==
- Victoria Justice as Grace Shaw
- Devon Ross as Aria
- Taylor John Smith as Alex Burke
- Sasha Luss as Tovia
- Dermot Mulroney as Mr. Evers
- Alex Roe as Claude

== Production ==
In December 2023, it was revealed that a crime mystery thriller film titled Depravity had completed principal photography in Thailand at Baang Rig Studios, with Paul Tamasy writing and directing the film. Victoria Justice, Devon Ross, Taylor John Smith, Sasha Luss and Dermot Mulroney rounded out the main cast. In May 2024, Justice revealed that she had to film her very first sex scene on the first day of filming, which made her uncomfortable.

== Release ==
Depravity was released on October 15, 2024, in the United States.
