= The Last Front =

Belgian film

- Directed by: Julien Hayet-Kerknawi
- Screenplay by: Julien Hayet-Kerknawi; Kate Wood
- Story by: Julien Hayet-Kerknawi
- Produced by: Virginie Hayet; Martin Dewitte; Bart Eycken
- Starring: Iain Glen; Sasha Luss; Joe Anderson; David Calder; Koen De Bouw
- Cinematography: Xavier Van D'huynslager
- Edited by: Dieter Allaerts; David Verdurme
- Music by: Frederik Van de Moortel
- Distributed by: Kinepolis Film Distribution; Dutch Filmworks
- Release date: 9 August 2024 (United States)
- Country: Belgium
- Language: English

The Last Front is a 2024 Belgian epic period action drama film written and directed by Julien Hayet-Kerknawi. Set during World War I, it follows a widower farmer who becomes a war hero, Leonard (Iain Glen), and his family as they are thrown into the midst of a war they do not understand. It is set during the first days of the conflict as the German war machine advances and during what came to be known as the Rape of Belgium.

== Plot ==
It is set during World War I and follows Leonard as he is driven to spearhead a resistance and protect his community during the German invasion of Belgium.

== Development ==
The Last Front builds on the short film A Broken Man that Kerknawi made in 2015 and which received international recognition, being selected to screen at the 2016 Cannes Film Festival as well as winning an award at the WorldFest film festival in Houston.

== Cast ==
- Iain Glen as Leonard
- Sasha Luss as Louise
- Joe Anderson as Leutnant Laurentz
- David Calder as Father Michael
- James Downie as Adrien
- Julian Kostov as Thomas Bosmans
- Koen De Bouw as Dr. Janssen
- Philippe Brenninkmeyer as Major Maximilian Von Rauch
- Mathijs Scheepers as Unteroffizer Weber
- Joren Seldeslachts as Enzo
- Trine Thielen as Elise
- Anna Ballantine as Camille Maes
- Leander Vyvey as Feldwebel Peer Schultz
- Emma Moortgat as Maria
- Caroline Stas as Brigitte
- Kevin Murphy as Fergal
- Sam Rintoul as Henri Maes
- Emma Dumont as Johanna
- Steve Armand as Nicolas

== Themes ==
The Last Front delves into themes of lost connections, grief, and the complexity of human nature amidst the chaos of war. By focusing on the nuanced interactions between characters, the film offers a contemplative look at war, emphasising the internal battles faced by individuals as much as the physical conflicts that surround them.

Hayet-Kerknawi said he deliberately wanted to move away from the usual tropes of World War I movies. "No trenches, no left-side Allies, right-side Germans", he said. "I want to show the people how the people themselves handled the First World War, how they had to fight and struggle."

== Release ==
The Last Front had its world premiere at Kinepolis in Ghent on 1 February 2024. The film was released in Belgium on 7 February 2024, and in the United States on 9 August 2024, with plans for future releases in other territories yet to be disclosed.

== Reception ==
On review aggregator Rotten Tomatoes, the film holds an approval rating of 71% based on 14 reviews. On Metacritic, the film has a weighted average score of 56 out of 100, based on four critics, indicating "mixed or average" reviews.
