= Freedom of Information (Amendment) Bill =

The Freedom of Information (Amendment) Bill was a private members bill introduced to the House of Commons of the United Kingdom in 2007 which failed to become law after a sponsor for the Bill could not be found in the House of Lords.

== Background and rationale ==
Conservative Member of Parliament David Maclean introduced the bill to ensure that MPs correspondence is exempt from freedom of information laws such as the Freedom of Information Act 2000. Maclean said of his Bill:

If someone approached me and asked for a letter sent to the police or a council about a constituent, I would tell them to go away. But there have been cases where the other body can be approached and things slip through the net. I want to make sure this cannot happen. The move would protect constituents and MPs. If an MP writes to their chief constable trying to get off a driving ban - that is totally different. I am flagging up the issue but I expect nothing will happen.

Although the government claimed it was neutral on the issue, private members bills rarely pass without government support, leading to claims the executive tacitly supported moves to water down freedom of information legislation. Members of the backbench committee of the Parliamentary Labour Party had emailed colleagues in support of the bill. The email said:

We feel strongly... that the measures contained the bill, which would protect the confidentiality of MPs correspondence on behalf of constituents, are worthy of support [...] We hope you would agree that MPs correspondence on behalf of a constituent to a public authority should remain confidential.

The proposed changes complemented Government proposals to change the way freedom of information requests are costed. Critics of the changes claimed the intention was to keep embarrassing information secret, rather than to save money.

== Progress through Parliament ==
The bill was withdrawn after its first reading in the House of Lords. It seemed to have failed for lack of a sponsor in the House of Lords and due to the action of Jack Straw.

A full account of the Parliamentary votes on 20 April 2007 and 18 May is available on Public Whip.
