= Liberty Kid =

- Directed by: Ilya Chaiken
- Written by: Ilya Chaiken
- Produced by: Larry Fessenden; Roger Kass; Mike King; Mike S. Ryan; Claude Wasserstein
- Starring: Al Thompson; Kareem Savinon; Anny Mariano; Rayniel Rufino
- Cinematography: Eliot Rockett
- Edited by: Dave Rock
- Music by: Jeff Grace
- Production company: Glass Eye Pix
- Release date: June 2007 (Los Angeles Film Festival)
- Running time: 92 minutes
- Country: United States
- Language: English

Liberty Kid is a 2007 low-budget American film directed by Ilya Chaiken.

== Plot ==
Two friends Derrick and Tico lost their jobs at a concession stand at the Statue of Liberty because of the September 11 attacks. In order to make money, they become drug dealers and participate in insurance scams. Derrick wants to go to college and has to support his two kids. When recruiters from the army come, Derrick decides to join the army because he is told that he'll get money for college and live rent free. When he tells his mom his decision, she says that she is afraid that he'll have to go to war. The recruiter tells him that his mom is only worried because it is her job as a mom.

== Reception ==
The film got 87% on Rotten Tomatoes out of 15 reviews.

Stephen Farber of The Hollywood Reporter said that even though "Liberty Kid" is a small film, much of it is deeply poignant; it enhances our compassion for all the ghosts of Sept. 11. Its cautiously optimistic conclusion also strikes a welcome note without falling into sentimentality. Bilge Ebiri of The Nerve said that a lesser director would have played this story for cheap emotions. But to her eternal credit, Chaiken keeps her movie grounded in her characters, allowing Thompson and Savinon's true-to-life performances to carry us through what is, on paper, an elaborate plot. Don Willmot of Film Critic said that Thompson and Savinon are a terrific pair and deserve big parts in bigger films.

== Awards ==
The film won Best Film at the New York Latino Film Festival. The film won Critics' Pick from both The New York Times and New York Magazine.

== Film festivals ==
The film played at New York Latino Film Festival, the Woodstock Film Festival, and the Atlanta Film Festival.

== DVD release ==
The DVD has an audio commentary by Chaiken, Thompson, and Saviñon, deleted scenes, behind the scenes featurette, photo gallery, and conversations with Iraq War veterans as special features. The DVD is in 5.1 stereo sound.
