= Information Tribunal =

Tribunal non-departmental public body in the United Kingdom

The Information Tribunal was a tribunal non-departmental public body in the United Kingdom. It was established as the Data Protection Tribunal to hear appeals under the Data Protection Act 1984. Its name was changed to reflect its wider responsibilities under other freedom of information legislation, as it then heard appeals from notices issued by Information Commissioner under two Acts of Parliament, the Data Protection Act 1998 and the Freedom of Information Act 2000, and two related Statutory Instruments, the Privacy and Electronic Communications Regulations 2003 and the Environmental Information Regulations 2004.

In 2010 the tribunal became part of the General Regulatory Chamber of the First-tier Tribunal, referred to as the First-tier Tribunal (Information Rights), as part of the reform of the structure of the UK system of tribunals.

The last Chairman of the tribunal was lawyer John Angel, formerly of Clifford Chance, and now a consultant with Jomati and a Visiting Professorial Fellow at Queen Mary, University of London. There were nine Deputy Chairmen, all of whom were experienced solicitors or barristers.
