= Freedom of Information Act 2000 =

Act of the Parliament of the United Kingdom

Freedom of Information Act 2000 (Note: Section 88(1).)
- Act of Parliament
- Parliament of the United Kingdom
- Long title: An Act to make provision for the disclosure of information held by public authorities or by persons providing services for them and to amend the Data Protection Act 1998 and the Public Records Act 1958; and for connected purposes.
- Citation: 2000 c. 36
- Territorial extent: United Kingdom (Note: Section 88(2).)

Dates
- Royal assent: 30 November 2000
- Commencement: 30 November 2000 (part), (Note: Section 87.); 30 January 2001 (part), 14 May 2001 (part), and 1 January 2005 ("general right of access")
Other legislation
Amends	Public Records Act 1958; House of Commons Disqualification Act 1975; Tribunals and Inquiries Act 1992; Health Service Commissioners Act 1993
Amended by	List: Justice (Northern Ireland) Act 2002; Scottish Public Services Ombudsman Act 2002; Horserace Betting and Olympic Lottery Act 2004; Human Tissue Act 2004; Railways Act 2005; National Lottery Act 2006; National Health Service (Consequential Provisions) Act 2006; Child Maintenance and Other Payments Act 2008; Constitutional Reform and Governance Act 2010; Academies Act 2010; Identity Documents Act 2010; Postal Services Act 2011; Statute Law (Repeals) Act 2013; Justice and Security Act 2013; Intellectual Property Act 2014; Infrastructure Act 2015; Cities and Local Government Devolution Act 2016; Inquiries into Fatal Accidents and Sudden Deaths etc. (Scotland) Act 2016; Policing and Crime Act 2017; Trade Act 2021; Domestic Abuse Act 2021; Elections and Elected Bodies (Wales) Act 2024; Institute for Apprenticeships and Technical Education (Transfer of Functions etc) Act 2025; Employment Rights Act 2025
Relates to	Freedom of Information (Scotland) Act 2002

Status: Amended

Text of statute as originally enacted

Revised text of statute as amended

Document

The Freedom of Information Act 2000 (c. 36) (FOIA) is an act of the Parliament of the United Kingdom that creates a public right of access to information held by public authorities. It is the implementation of freedom of information legislation in the United Kingdom on a national level. Its application is limited in Scotland (which has its own freedom of information legislation) to UK Government offices located in Scotland. The act implements a manifesto commitment of the Labour Party in the 1997 general election, developed by David Clark as a 1997 White Paper. The final version of the act was criticised by freedom of information campaigners as a diluted form of what had been proposed in the White Paper. The full provisions of the act came into force on 1 January 2005. The act was the responsibility of the Lord Chancellor's Department (now renamed the Ministry of Justice). However, freedom of information policy is now the responsibility of the Cabinet Office. The act led to the renaming of the Data Protection Commissioner (set up to administer the Data Protection Act 1998), who is now known as the Information Commissioner. The Office of the Information Commissioner oversees the operation of the act.

A second freedom of information law is in existence in the UK, the Freedom of Information (Scotland) Act 2002 (asp 13). It was passed by the Scottish Parliament in 2002, to cover public bodies over which the Holyrood parliament, rather than Westminster, has jurisdiction. For these institutions, it fulfils the same purpose as the 2000 Act.

Around 120,000 requests were made in the first year that the act was in force. Private citizens made 60% of them, with businesses and journalists accounting for 20% and 10% respectively. However, requests from journalists tended to be more complex, and, consequently, more expensive. They accounted for around 10% of initial FoI requests made to central government, but 20% of the costs of officials' time in dealing with the requests. The act cost £35.5 million in 2005.

== Background ==
The act implemented a manifesto commitment of the Labour Party in the 1997 general election. Before its introduction, there had been no legal right of access to government held information by the general public, merely a limited voluntary framework for sharing information.

=== The white paper ===
The act was preceded by a 1998 white paper, Your Right to Know, by David Clark. The white paper was met with widespread enthusiasm, and was described at the time as being "almost too good to be true" by one advocate of freedom of information legislation. The final act was substantially more limited in scope than the initial white paper.

=== Parliamentary debate ===
A draft bill was published in May 1999; the bill was extensively debated in the House of Commons and the House of Lords, and received royal assent in November 2000.

== How the act affected access to public records ==
The FOIA modernised the Public Records Act 1958. This act gave the public a general right to access all types of recorded information held by public authorities, much greater than was previously allowed. The FOIA was mainly concerned with the management and preservation of public records.

=== Access to more recent records ===
The FOIA reduced the 30-year rule to a 20-year rule, meaning records would be made public earlier. This gave the public the ability to access more recent records without sacrificing national security or personal privacy.

=== Creation of the Information Commissioner's Office ===
A significant part of the FOIA was the establishment of the Information Commissioner's Office (ICO). This office oversees the upholding of information rights in the public interest, as well as making sure the FOIA is adhered to properly. If someone thinks a public body is intentionally not releasing the information they have asked for, the ICO is the agency to contact. They are essentially the centralised management and oversight agency for all things pertaining to public records.

=== Real-time reporting ===
While there was still a waiting period for the public to access records, the FOIA also established a system of real-time reporting of records to the National Archives which could be accessed by all UK government agencies.

=== Digitisation of public records ===
This is also when public records began to become digitised which also meant that the time frame for accessing records was immediate or real-time. This is an ongoing process that started with the advent of the digital age of the 21st century and is today a common practice for all UK public records.

== Act ==
=== Applicability ===
The Freedom of Information Act creates a statutory right for access to information in relation to bodies that exercise functions of a public nature. Three different kinds of bodies are covered under the act: Public Authorities, publicly owned companies and designated bodies performing public functions.

==== Public authorities ====
In principle, the freedom of information act applies to all "public authorities" within the United Kingdom. A full list of "public authorities" for the purposes of the act is included in Schedule 1. Government departments, the Houses of Parliament, the Northern Ireland Assembly, the Welsh Assembly, the armed forces, local government bodies, National Health Service bodies, schools, colleges and universities, police authorities and Chief Officers of Police are included within this list, which ranges from the Farm Animal Welfare Council to the Youth Council for Northern Ireland. A few government departments are expressly excluded from the scope of the act, principally intelligence services. The act does not cover the Scottish Parliament and Scottish Government, which are instead subject to the Freedom of Information (Scotland) Act 2002.

As government departments are created or closed, the act must be updated. Schedule 4 of the act empowers the Secretary of State for Constitutional Affairs to add a body or officeholder to Schedule 1 as a public authority if they are created statute or prerogative; and its members are appointed by the government.

===== Hybrid public authorities =====
For some public authorities listed under Schedule 1, the act has limited effect. For example, the BBC is subject to the act only for information which is not held for the purposes of journalism, art or literature, to prevent its journalistic activities from possible compromise. The scope of this provision was considered in the 2007 High Court decision of BBC v Sugar, an internal BBC document examining the BBC coverage of the Middle East for potential bias. The appellants in that case argued that the document had been produced for both operational and journalistic reasons, and so should not be covered by the partial exemption provided in the act. The High Court rejected this argument; Mr Justice Irwin considered that the meaning of journalism within the act meant that any information held for such purposes was covered by the exemption:

My conclusion is that the words in the Schedule mean the BBC has no obligation to disclose information which they hold to any significant extent for the purposes of journalism, art or literature, whether or not the information is also held for other purposes. The words do not mean that the information is disclosable if it is held for purposes distinct from journalism, art or literature, whilst it is also held to any significant extent for those listed purposes. If the information is held for mixed purposes, including to any significant extent the purposes listed in the Schedule or one of them, then the information is not disclosable.

A 4:1 majority (Lord Wilson dissenting) of the Supreme Court upheld this decision, stating that the disclosure of any information held for the purposes of journalism, art or literature was to be excluded - even if the information was predominantly held for other purposes.

==== Publicly owned companies ====
Companies that fall within the definition of a publicly owned company under s6 of the act automatically fall within its grasp. S6 provides that a company is publicly owned if:

(a) it is wholly owned by the Crown, or
(b) it is wholly owned by any public authority listed in Schedule 1 other than

(i) a government department, or
(ii) any authority which is listed only in relation to particular information.

==== Designated bodies ====
Under Section 5 of the act, the Secretary of State may designate further bodies as public authorities under the act, provided that those bodies are exercising a function of a public nature or contracting to provide a service whose provision is a function of a public authority. The first order under section 5 (in November 2011) extended the list of public authorities to also include the Association of Chief Police Officers, the Financial Ombudsman Service and UCAS.

Schedule 1 of the act deliberately uses generic descriptions to ensure the legislation's wide application, and does not need to specifically mention every organisation classed as a public authority under FOIA.

=== Right of access ===
The act creates a general right of access, on request, to information held by public authorities. On receipt of a freedom of information request a public authority has two corresponding duties. First, a duty to inform a member of the public whether or not it holds the information requested (s1(1)(a)), and second, if it does hold that information, to communicate it to the person making that request (s1(1)(b)). As the corollary to this, the act thus grants the equivalent rights to a confirmation or denial and communication of relevant information to an individual making a request under the act. The basic duty is supplemented by an additional duty to aid individuals in making requests and ensuring that they frame their FOI requests appropriately. (s.16(1))

However, there are numerous exemptions. Some of these are absolute bars to disclosure; some are qualified, which means the public authority has to decide whether the public interest in disclosing the relevant information outweighs the public interest in maintaining the exemption. An applicant for information who considers that a request has been wrongly rejected may apply to the Information Commissioner, who has the power to order disclosure. However, such orders can be appealed to a specialist tribunal (the Information Tribunal) and in some circumstances, the Government has the power to override orders of the Information Commissioner.

Any person can request information under the act; this includes legal entities such as companies. There is no special format for a request. Applicants do not need to mention the act when making a request. Applicants do not have to give a reason for their request.

=== Exemptions ===
Although the act covers a wide range of government information, the act contains a variety of provisions that provide for the exemption from disclosure of certain types of information. The act contains two forms of exemption: "absolute" exemptions that are not subject to any public interest assessment, they act as absolute bars to the disclosure of information; and "qualified" exemptions where a public interest test must be made, balancing the public interest in maintaining the exemption against the public interest in disclosing the information. The original Freedom of Information White Paper proposed 15 such exemptions, but the final Bill included 24, and not all of the initial 15 were included.

==== Absolute exemptions ====
Exemptions designated "absolute exemptions" have no public interest test attached. The act contains eight such exemptions:

- Information that is accessible by other means (s.21)
- Information belonging to security services (s.23)
- Information contained in court records (s.32)
- Where disclosure of the information would infringe parliamentary privilege (s.34)
- Information held by the House of Commons or the House of Lords, where disclosure would prejudice the effective conduct of public affairs (s.36). (Information that is not held by the Commons or Lords falling under s.36 is subject to the public interest test)
- Information which (a) the applicant could obtain under the Data Protection Act 1998; or (b) where release would breach the data protection principles. (s.40)
- Information provided in confidence (s.41)
- When disclosing the information is prohibited by an enactment; incompatible with a European Union obligation; or would commit a contempt of court (s.44)

==== Qualified exemptions ====
If information falls within a qualified exemption, it must be subject to a public interest test. Thus, a decision on the application of a qualified exemption operates in two stages. First, a public authority must determine whether or not the information is covered by an exemption and then, even if it is covered, the authority must disclose the information unless the application of a public interest test indicated that the public interest favours non-disclosure. Qualified exemptions can be subdivided into two further categories: class-based exemptions covering information in particular classes, and harm-based exemptions covering situations where disclosure of information would be liable to cause harm.

==== Class-based exemptions ====
- Information intended for future publication (s.22)
- Information which does not fall within s. 23(1) is exempt if required for the purpose of safeguarding national security (s.24)
- Information held for purposes of investigations and proceedings conducted by public authorities (s.30)
- Information relating to the formation of government policy, ministerial communications, advice from government legal officers, and the operation of any ministerial private office (s.35)
- Information that relates to communications with members of the Royal family, and conferring honours (s.37)
- Prevents overlap between FoI Act and regulations requiring disclosure of environmental information (s.39)
- Information covered by professional legal privilege (s.42)
- Trade secrets (s.43(1))

==== Harm-based exemptions ====
Under these exemptions the exemption applies (subject to the public interest test) if complying with the duty under s.1 would, or would be likely to:

- Prejudice defence or the capability, effectiveness or security of any relevant forces (s.26)
- Prejudice international relations (s.27)
- Prejudice relations between any administration in the United Kingdom and any other such administration (s.28)
- Prejudice the economic interests of the UK (s.29)
- Prejudice law enforcement (e.g., prevention of crime or administration of justice, etc.) (s.31)
- Prejudice the auditing functions of any public authorities (s.33)
- In the reasonable opinion of a qualified person: prejudice the effective conduct of public affairs; prejudice collective responsibility, or inhibit the free and frank provision of advice or exchange of views (s.36)
- Endanger physical or mental health, or endanger the safety of the individual (s.38)
- Prejudice commercial interests (s.43(2)).

=== Refusing requests ===
==== Vexatious requests ====
A public authority is not obliged to comply with a request for information if the request is vexatious (s14(1)). A request is considered vexatious if it is 'obsessive or manifestly unreasonable', harasses the authority or causes distress to its staff, imposes a significant burden, or if the request lacks any serious value.

=== Implementing the act ===
The act affects over 100,000 public bodies including government departments, schools and councils. The act came into force in phases, with the final "general right of access" to public information under the act coming into force on 1 January 2005. As well as the "general right of access", the act places a duty on public authorities to adopt and maintain pro-active "publication schemes" for the routine release of important information (such as annual reports and accounts). These publication schemes must be approved by the Information Commissioner. In general, public authorities have 20 working days to respond to an information request, though this deadline can be extended in certain cases and/or with the agreement of the requester. Under the act, public authorities are encouraged to enter into a dialogue with the requester to better determine the information they want, and the format they want it in - in itself, a change in the way UK authorities interact with the public. Requests can be refused if they cost more than £600, including time spent searching for files. The UK Government established the Access to Information Central Clearing House in order to ensure consistency across Central Government in the way requests are handled.

=== Contrasts with law in other jurisdictions ===
Three aspects of the UK's Freedom of Information Act differ from the position in many other countries:

- Requests by individuals for access to their own personal information are dealt with outside the act for most practical purposes. They are dealt with under the Data Protection Act 2018 once it has been determined that the exemption for first party personal data is engaged, although some provisions remain applicable e.g. the right of complaint to the Information Commissioner.
- Requests for information about matters concerning the environment are dealt with by the Environmental Information Regulations 2004. Those regulations, while similar to the FOIA, do differ in a number of ways.
- There is no procedure whereby third parties can challenge a decision by a public authority to disclose information: for instance, if a commercial organisation provides information to a public authority, and the authority decides to disclose that information in response to an FOI Act request, the commercial organisation has no right of appeal against that decision. By contrast, "reverse FOI" applications of this type are common in the U.S.

== Reception ==
At the time of the passing of the act, advocates of freedom of information legislation were critical of the bill for its complexity, limited scope and the inclusion of a ministerial veto. Lord Mackay criticised the bill in the House of Lords for its inclusion of provisions allowing ministers to veto applications.

By contrast, Tony Blair, the prime minister responsible for passing the act regards it as "One of the biggest mistakes of his career". Blair says that "For political leaders, it's like saying to someone who is hitting you over the head with a stick, 'Hey, try this instead', and handing them a mallet. The information is neither sought because the journalist is curious to know, nor given to bestow knowledge on 'the people'. It's used as a weapon." Labour peer Lord Falconer has criticised the use of the act by journalists for "fishing expeditions" into salacious stories, arguing that "FoI is not for press[,] it is for the people. It needs to be properly used in order to promote good Government. Information needs to be handled responsibly, and I strongly believe that there is a duty of responsibility on behalf of the media as well."

In the article Freedom of Information: A sheep in wolf's clothing? Rodney Austin offers the following criticisms of the substance of the act:

- The range of exemptions is wider than for any other freedom of information act existing in a democratic state.
- The obligations to establish publication schemes were diluted meaning that there is no duty to publish information of any specified type.
- There is a ministerial veto which undermines the act. This has been used five times: the first time to stop publication of minutes of cabinet meetings relating to the invasion of Iraq, the second and third time by successive governments to stop publication of cabinet meetings relating to discussions regarding devolution, the fourth to stop publication of a risk register on NHS overhaul in England, and the fifth to stop publication of private letters of Charles III, then the Prince of Wales, sent to a number of government departments.

The legislation has also been criticised for "loopholes" that allow authorities to avoid disclosing information in certain situations. Companies owned by one public authority are generally subject to the act but companies owned by two or more public authorities are not covered.

== Facts revealed by the act ==
Facts that have been brought to light by this Act include:

- The parliamentary expenses scandal was originally exposed after a series of FoI requests, and that Ministers and MPs claimed thousands of pounds on taxis as part of £5.9 million in expenses for travel.
- The Government agreed to a £1.5 million bailout of one of the most troubled schools in its flagship academies programme ten days before the 2005 general election.
- Foreign diplomats – who have diplomatic immunity – were accused of rapes, sexual assaults, child abuse and murders while working in Britain.
- Seventy-four police officers serving with the Metropolitan Police have criminal records.
- A clandestine British torture programme existed in post-war Germany, "reminiscent of the concentration camps".
- The UK supported the Israeli nuclear weapons program, by selling Israel 20 tonnes of heavy water in 1958.
- The NHS has made available Implanon implants to girls from the age of 13 in an attempt to cut teenage pregnancies.

=== Data breaches ===
- On 8 August 2023, the Police Service of Northern Ireland inadvertently responded to a FoI request made using WhatDoTheyKnow by supplementing the source data used to answer the request, which included the personal details of all police officers and staff on the force.

== Amendment bill ==
The Freedom of Information (Amendment) Bill was a private member's bill introduced to the British House of Commons in 2007 which failed to become law. Conservative MP David Maclean introduced the bill to ensure that MPs' correspondence was exempt from freedom of information laws. The leader of the Liberal Democrats, Sir Menzies Campbell, said there should not "be one law for MPs and a different law for everyone else" and that the Bill might make it appear as though "Parliament has something to hide". The bill failed to pass its first reading in the House of Lords.

Further to this, Lord Falconer made comments suggesting that time spent deciding whether or not information fell under an exemption clause should be included in the £600 cost limit. Consultation was carried out, with the government saying the change would cut costs and discourage requests for trivial information, although critics said that it was to keep embarrassing information secret.

== See also ==
- Campaign for Freedom of Information
- Directive on the re-use of public sector information (The Re-use of Public Sector Information Regulations 2015)
- Thirty year rule
