= Horizon (1971 film) =

1971 Hungarian film directed by Pál Gábor

- Directed by: Pál Gábor
- Written by: Pál Gábor; Luca Karall; Gyula Marosi
- Produced by: György Onódi
- Starring: Péter Fried
- Cinematography: János Zsombolyai
- Edited by: Zoltán Farkas
- Release date: 1971
- Running time: 87 minutes
- Country: Hungary
- Language: Hungarian

Horizon (Hungarian: Horizont) is a Hungarian film directed by Pál Gábor. It was released in 1971.

== Cast ==
- Péter Fried - Karesz
- Lujza Orosz - Karesz anyja
- Szilvia Marossy - Ágnes
- József Madaras - Autószerelõ
- Zsuzsa Bognár - Rózsa
- Zoltán Vadász - Hajdú elvtárs
- Erzsi Hegedüs - Hajdúné
- Ferenc Baracsi - Götz tanár úr
- Ilona Gurnik - Asszistensnõ
- Ildikó Hámori - Titkárnõ
- Miklós Stern - Bajuszos pszichológus
- Hugó Szerencsi - Portás
- Ernõ Szénási - Tisztviselõ
- Sándor Szoboszlai - Szemüveges pszichológus
- György Vizi
