= Enzo Lauretta =

Italian writer (1924–2014)

- Born: 22 March 1924; Pachino, Italy
- Died: 6 August 2014 (aged 90); Agrigento, Italy
- Occupation: Writer

Vincenzo "Enzo" Lauretta (22 March 1924 – 6 August 2014) was an Italian novelist, essayist and politician.

== Life and career ==
Born in Pachino, in 1936 Lauretta moved to Agrigento with his family. A double graduate in literature and law, he made his literary debut in 1952 with the collection of short stories I sogni degli altri ("The Dreams of Others"). He received several awards for his novels, including the Rhegium Julii National Prize and the Sila Prize for La sposa era bellissima ("The Bride Was Beautiful", 1984), the Nino Martoglio International Literary Prize for Maddalena (1991), and the Chianti Literary Prize for L'amore truccato ("The Rigged Love", 1998). Two of his novels were adapted into films, The Bride Was Beautiful in 1986 and The Salmons of St. Lawrence in 2003. In 1967 he founded the Centro Nazionale Studi Pirandelliani ('National Center for Pirandellian Studies'), and Luigi Pirandello was always the main subject of his studies and his essayistic activity.

Beyond literature, Lauretta was a major figure in Agrigento's political life, among other things serving the roles of mayor, president of the province and president of the Ente Provinciale del Turismo (Provincial Tourist Authority). From 1952 to 1958, he also served as president of the Unione Sportiva Akragas.
