= Szoboszlai =

Szoboszlai is a surname. Notable people with the surname include:

- Dominik Szoboszlai (born 2000), Hungarian footballer, son of Zsolt
- Sándor Szoboszlai (1925–2013), Hungarian actor
- Zsolt Szoboszlai (born 1974), Hungarian footballer
