= Giovanni Leone (geophysicist) =

Italian geophysicist and volcanologist (born 1967)

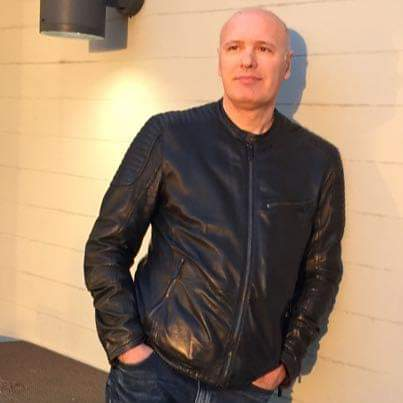
Giovanni Leone

Giovanni Leone (10 February 1967 in Agrigento) is an Italian geophysicist and volcanologist. His main activity is the study of planetary geology and volcanology of the Solar System.

In 2014 Leone proposed that the Valles Marineris on Mars was formed by lava and not water. In the same year, he published the results of his 3D computer simulations showing that the Martian dichotomy was formed by the Great South Polar Impact as an alternative hypothesis to the Great North Polar Impact. Some 2D models of the Large South Polar Impact were already developed by other authors since 2006.

In 2016, Leone found a confirmation of this hypothesis with the discovery of 12 volcanic alignments in the southern hemisphere of Mars, just as the 3D model had predicted. His observations of large Martian canyons and networks of lava channels from volcanoes, together with the presence of olivine unaltered since the Noachian, are challenging past visions of a hot and humid Mars with an Earth-like environment.

== Biography ==
Leone spent his first six years in Agrigento.after which his family moved to Palermo. As a child he soon showed a strong interest in science and astronomy. At the age of 15, his father gave him a portable Newton telescope with a diameter of 114 mm, with which he began to observe the sky both from his home and from the Madonie mountains with his childhood companion, the astrophotographer Carmelo Zannelli. Together they observed Halley's comet during the 1986 passage.

After graduating from highs school in 1986,, Leone began to focus his interest on the planets of the Solar System, with particular attention to the rocky planets. This interest led him towards the study of Geological Sciences, thanks to which he could tackle the study of the internal structure of the planets. So, he decided to enroll in a course of Geological Sciences at the University of Palermo, specializing in geophysics.

== Career ==
In 1993, after obtaining his degree in Geological Sciences, Leone co-authored and presented two programmes on a local TV station in Palermo, Canale 21, entitled "A come Astronomia" and "Nova", answering questions from the public live. These were the years when he began to have his first doubts about the existence of water on Mars.

In 1996 Leone began his first doctorate at the University of Lancaster in the United Kingdom under the supervision of Professor Lionel Wilson. In 1997, he changed his enrolment at Lancaster University to part time and returned to Palermo. In 2001, he had the opportunity of a research grant at the University of Lecce in Italy to work on the preliminary studies of the Spirit rover mission to Mars in collaboration with NASA's Ames Research Center.

In 2007 Leone received his PhD from Lancaster. In 2008. he was invited by NASA to the Jet Propulsion Lab for a seminar on the volcanism of Io, the main research topic of his PhD thesis on the Galileo mission to Jupiter. In the following years, he decided to take another PhD at the Swiss Federal Institute of Technology in Zurich to complete his knowledge of planets from surface to core.

During this period, Leoneused the software of his supervisor Professor Paul James Tackley and collaborator Professor Taras Gerya to model in 3D The Great South Polar Impact on Mars. This experience, which began as a simple test of thermomechanical software, became a series of discoveries. The results showed that Mars was a volcanic world quite different from what had hitherto been imagined, namely hot and humid. The image of the red planet as a volcanic but cold and arid world also emerged.

== Current activities ==
In 2013, Leone named the following volcanic centres on Mars, names later approved by the Solar System Nomenclature Working Group: Aonia Mons, Aonia Tholus, Electris Mons, Eridania Mons, Sirenum Mons, Sirenum Tholus.

Leone currently is a professor the Institute of Astronomy and Planetary Sciences at the Universidad de Atacama with several interdisciplinary research projects between astronomy and planetary sciences.

Leone is also editor of the Journal of Volcanology and Geothermal Research and editor of a book project for Springer entitled "Mars: a volcanic world".
