= 40th Berlin International Film Festival =

1990 film festival in West Berlin, Germany

- Festival poster
- Opening film: Steel Magnolias
- Location: West Berlin, Germany
- Founded: 1951
- Awards: Golden Bear: Music Box; Larks on a String
- No. of films: 467 films
- Festival date: 9 – 20 February 1990
- Website: http://www.berlinale.de

Berlin International Film Festival chronology
- 41st 39th

The 40th annual Berlin International Film Festival was held from 9 to 20 February 1990. The festival opened with Steel Magnolias by Herbert Ross, which was shown out of competition.

The Golden Bear was awarded ex aequo to the American film Music Box directed by Costa-Gavras and Czechoslovak film Larks on a String directed by Jiří Menzel.

The retrospective of this edition included two programs: The Year 1945, dedicated to international productions released in 1945, and 40 Years Berlinale, dedicated to some of the most significant films presented during the past editions of the festival.

== Jury ==
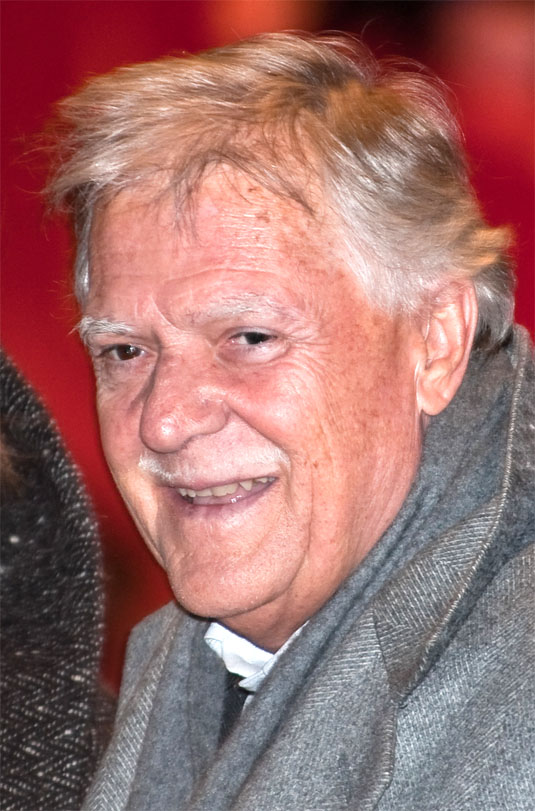
Michael Ballhaus, Co-Jury President

The following people were announced as being on the jury for the festival:

- Michael Ballhaus, West-German director of photography - Jury President
- Margaret Ménégoz, French producer - Jury Co-president
- Vadim Abdrashitov, Soviet filmmaker
- Suzana Amaral, Brazilian filmmaker
- Steven Bach, American writer and producer
- Roberto Benigni, Italian actor, filmmaker
- Lívia Gyarmathy, Hungarian director and screenwriter
- Helke Misselwitz, East-German filmmaker
- Otto Sander, West-German actor
- Stephen Silverman, American actor
- Rita Tushingham, British actress

== Official Sections ==
=== Main Competition ===
The following films were in competition for the Golden Bear:

English title	Original title	Director(s)	Country
Angels	Los ángeles	Jacob Berger	Spain, France, Switzerland, Belgium
The Asthenic Syndrome	Астенический синдром	Kira Muratova	Soviet Union
Black Snow	本命年	Xie Fei	China
Born on the Fourth of July	Born on the Fourth of July	Oliver Stone	United States
Coming Out		Heiner Carow	East Germany
Driving Miss Daisy		Bruce Beresford	United States
The Handmaid's Tale		Volker Schlöndorff	United States, West Germany
Crossing Borders	Herzlich willkommen	Hark Bohm	West Germany
The Guard	Караул	Aleksandr Rogozhkin	Soviet Union
Larks on a String	Skřivánci na niti	Jiří Menzel	Czechoslovakia
Music Box		Costa-Gavras	United States
The Nasty Girl	Das schreckliche Mädchen	Michael Verhoeven	West Germany
The Paper Wedding	Les noces de papier	Michel Brault	Canada
Shadow Makers		Roland Joffé	United States
The Secret	Il segreto	Francesco Maselli	Italy
Sentenced to Death	A halálraítélt	János Zsombolyai	Hungary
Silent Scream		David Hayman	United Kingdom
The Winter War	Talvisota	Pekka Parikka	Finland
A Woman's Revenge	La vengeance d'une femme	Jacques Doillon	France
Tie Me Up! Tie Me Down!	¡Átame!	Pedro Almodóvar	Spain
The War of the Roses		Danny DeVito	United States

=== Out of competition ===
- 300 mil do nieba, directed by Maciej Dejczer (Poland)
- Everybody Wins, directed by Karel Reisz (United States, United Kingdom)
- Crimes and Misdemeanors, directed by Woody Allen (United States)
- Steel Magnolias, directed by Herbert Ross (United States)
- A Terra-Cotta Warrior, directed by Ching Siu-tung (Hong Kong)
- Conte de printemps, directed by Éric Rohmer (France)
- Resan till Melonia, directed by Per Åhlin (Sweden)
- Spur der Steine, directed by Frank Beyer (East Germany)

=== Retrospective ===
The following films were shown in the retrospective titled "The Year 1945":

English title	Original title	Director(s)	Country
A Defeated People		Humphrey Jennings	United Kingdom
A Diary for Timothy		Humphrey Jennings	United Kingdom
A Tree Grows in Brooklyn		Elia Kazan	United States
Fall of Berlin – 1945	Берлин Berlin	Yuli Raizman	Soviet Union
Images from German cities	Bilder aus deutschen Städten	(unknown)	Germany
Brief Encounter		David Lean	United Kingdom
Tragic Hunt	Caccia tragica	Giuseppe De Santis	Italy
Girl No. 217	Человек No. 217 Chelovek No. 217	Mikhail Romm	Soviet Union
The German newsreel of 1945	Die Deutsche Wochenschau aus dem Jahr 1945	Josef von Báky	Germany
Night of the Twelve	Die Nacht der Zwölf	Hans Schweikart	Germany
Death Mills	Die Todesmühlen	Hanuš Burger	Germany
Journey to Happiness	Fahrt ins Glück	Erich Engel	Germany
Fallen Angel		Otto Preminger	United States
Germany, Year Zero	Germania anno zero	Roberto Rossellini	Italy
Days of Glory	Giorni di gloria	Luchino Visconti, Giuseppe De Santis and Marcello Pagliero	Italy
Great Freedom No. 7	Große Freiheit Nr. 7	Helmut Käutner	Germany
Children of the Beehive	蜂の巣の子供たち	Hiroshi Shimizu	Japan
Henry V		Laurence Olivier	United Kingdom
Here Is Germany		Frank Capra	United States
Hitler Lives		Don Siegel	United States
Hollywood Victory Caravan		William D. Russell	United States
Hunger	Honger	Rudi Hornecker	Netherlands
Hotel Berlin		Peter Godfrey	United States
The Bandit	Il bandito	Alberto Lattuada	Italy
Ivan the Terrible	Иван Грозный	Sergei Eisenstein	Soviet Union
Victory of Women	女性の勝利	Kenji Mizoguchi	Japan
Kolberg		Veit Harlan	Germany
The Battle of the Rails	La Bataille du rail	René Clément	France
Lapin tuho		Brita Wrede	Finland
Le 6 juin à l'aube		Jean Grémillon	France
Reunion	Le Retour	Henri Cartier-Bresson	France
The Ladies of the Bois de Boulogne	Les Dames du Bois de Boulogne	Robert Bresson	France
Children of Paradise	Les Enfants du Paradis	Marcel Carné	France
The Damned	Les Maudits	René Clément	France
Let There Be Light		John Huston	United States
Mathilde Möhring		Rolf Hansen	Germany
The Famous Sword Bijomaru	名刀美女丸	Kenji Mizoguchi	Japan
Mildred Pierce		Michael Curtiz	United States
Ninotchka		Ernst Lubitsch	United States
Objective, Burma!		Raoul Walsh	United States
Rome, Open City	Roma città aperta	Roberto Rossellini	Italy
San Francisco		Willard Van Dyke	United States
Scarlet Street		Fritz Lang	United States
The Battle of San Pietro		John Huston	United States
The House on 92nd Street		Henry Hathaway	United States
The Last Chance	Die letzte Chance	Leopold Lindtberg	Switzerland
The Lost Weekend		Billy Wilder	United States
The Story of G.I. Joe		William A. Wellman	United States
The Stranger		Orson Welles	United States
The True Glory		Garson Kanin and Carol Reed	United Kingdom, United States
They Were Expendable		John Ford	United States
Lowlands	Tiefland	Leni Riefenstahl	West Germany
The Men Who Tread on the Tiger's Tail	虎の尾を踏む男達	Akira Kurosawa	Japan
Hymn of the Nations		Alexander Hammid	United States
To the Shores of Iwo Jima		(unknown)	United States
Two People	Tva människor	Carl Theodor Dreyer	Sweden
Two Down and One to Go		Frank Capra	United States
Under the Bridges	Unter den Brücken	Helmut Käutner	Germany
Somewhere in Europe	Valahol Európában	Géza von Radványi	Hungary
Via Mala		Josef von Báky	Germany
Encounter at the Elbe	Встреча на Эльбе	Grigori Aleksandrov and Aleksey Utkin	Soviet Union
War Comes to America		Frank Capra and Anatole Litvak	United States
The Annihilation of Berlin	Zaglada Berlina	Jerzy Bossak	Poland

== Official Awards ==
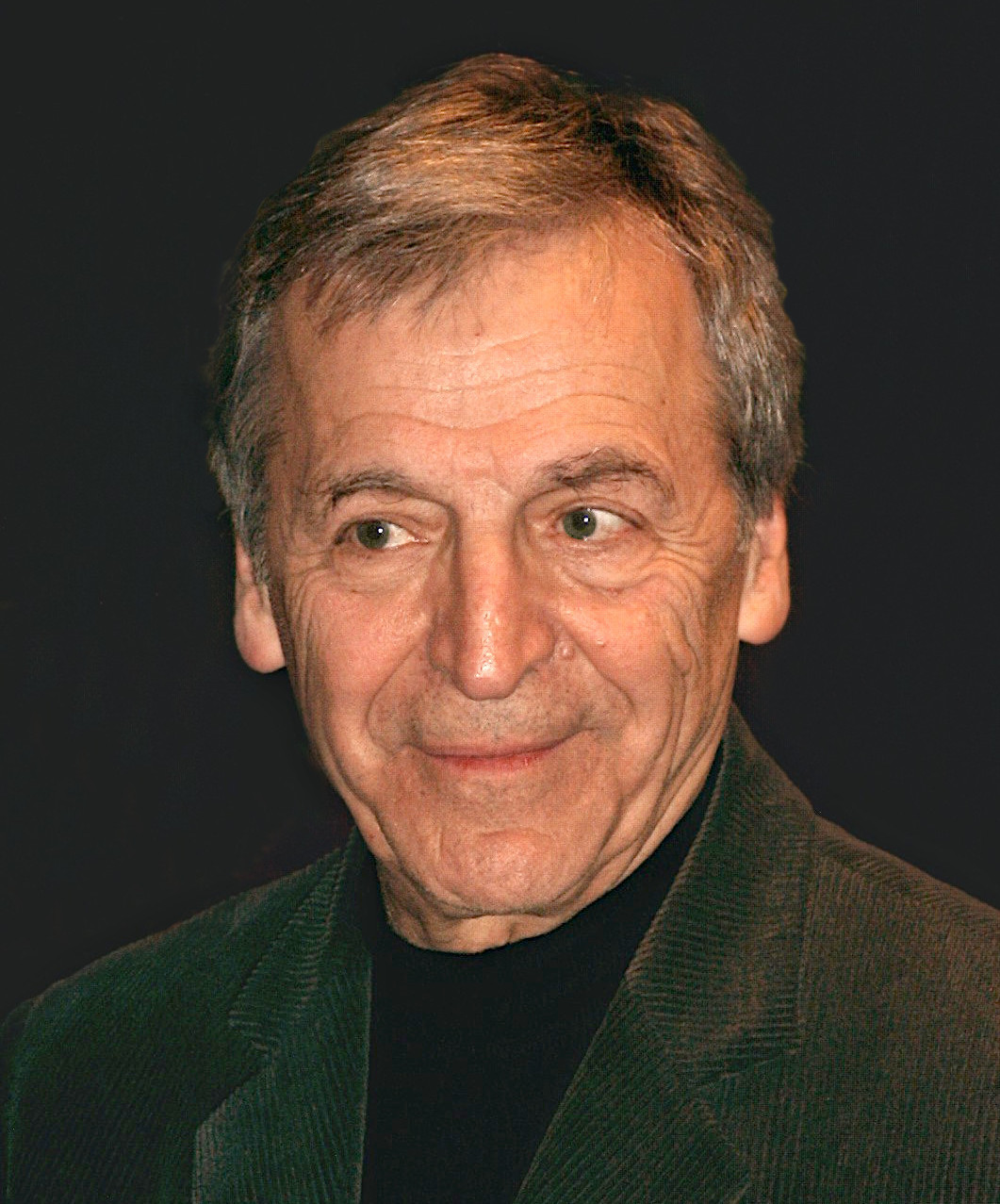
Costa-Gavras, co-winner of the Golden Bear at the event

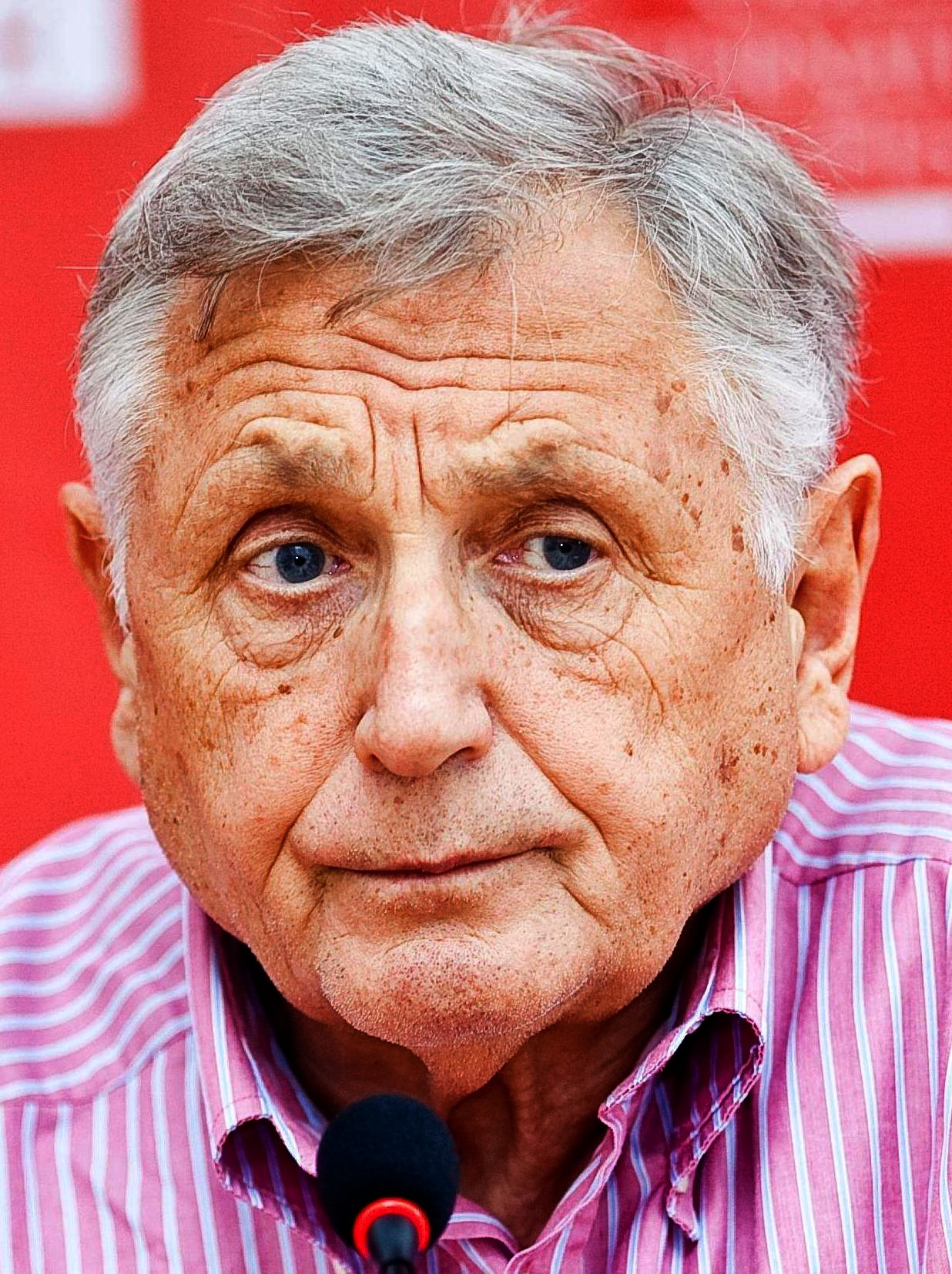
Jiří Menzel, co-winner of the Golden Bear at the event

The following prizes were awarded by the Jury:

- Golden Bear:
  - Music Box by Costa-Gavras
  - Larks on a String by Jiří Menzel
- Silver Bear – Special Jury Prize: The Asthenic Syndrome by Kira Muratova
- Silver Bear for Best Director: Michael Verhoeven for The Nasty Girl
- Silver Bear for Best Joint Performance: Jessica Tandy and Morgan Freeman
- Silver Bear for Best Actor: Iain Glen for Silent Scream
- Silver Bear for an outstanding single achievement: Black Snow by Xie Fei
- Silver Bear for an outstanding artistic contribution: Coming Out
- Alfred-Bauer Prize: Karaul
- FIPRESCI Award
  - Karaul by Aleksandr Rogozhkin
