= János Zsombolyai =

Hungarian cinematographer

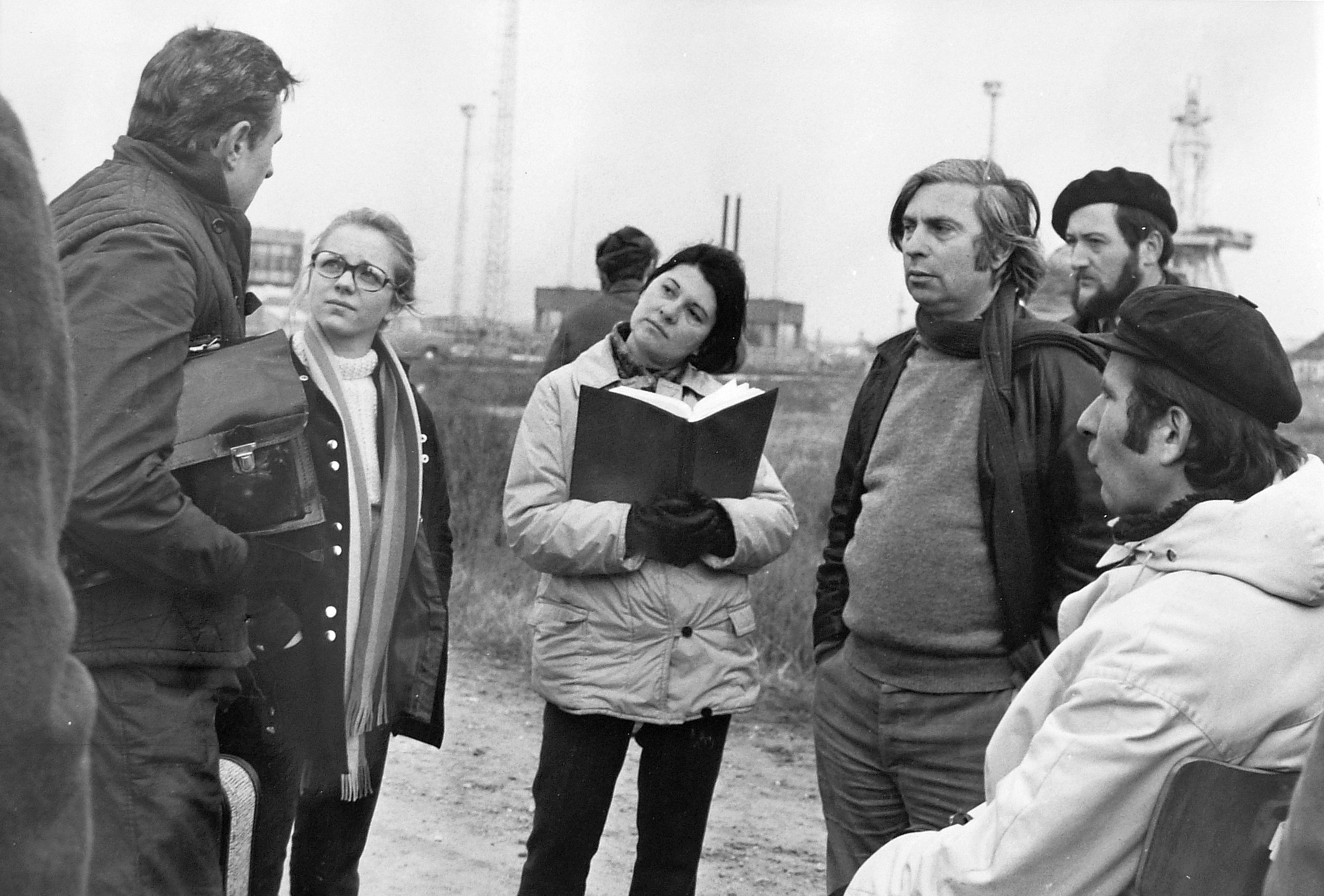
- Actor István Avar (left), director Péter Bacsó (with a scarf) and cinematographer János Zsombolyai (right) on the shooting of the film The Third Run.
- Born: 30 January 1939; Budapest, Hungary
- Died: 4 January 2015 (aged 75)
- Occupations: Cinematographer; Film director Screenwriter
- Years active: 1964–1997

János Zsombolyai (30 January 1939 – 4 January 2015) was a Hungarian cinematographer, film director and screenwriter. His 1989 film Sentenced to Death was entered into the 40th Berlin International Film Festival. His films A Kenguru ("The Kangaroo") (1975) and Vámmentes házasság ("Duty-Free Marriage") (1980) enjoy cult film status in Hungary.

== Selected filmography ==
- Forbidden Ground (1968)
- Horizon (1971)
- A Nice Neighbor (1979)
- Return (1985)
- Sentenced to Death (1989)
- Hungarian Rhapsody: Queen Live in Budapest ’86 (2012)
