= Forbidden Ground (1968 film) =

- Directed by: Pál Gábor
- Written by: Pál Gábor; Endre Vészi
- Starring: György Bánffy
- Cinematography: János Zsombolyai
- Edited by: Éva Kármentő
- Release date: 1968
- Running time: 83 minutes
- Country: Hungary
- Language: Hungarian

Forbidden Ground (Hungarian: Tiltott terület) is a Hungarian film directed by Pál Gábor. It was released in 1968.

== Cast ==
- György Bánffy - Benedek Kiss
- Zoltán Vadász - Ádám Hoffer
- István Avar - Attorney
- Ferenc Némethy
- Margit Dajka - Mrs. Széki
- Gyöngyi Bürös
- Mária Mezei
- István Novák
- Erzsi Orsolya
- Rita Békés
- Eta Máthé
- Erzsébet Kopácsi
- Gábor Harsányi - István Bodor
- János Kovács
- Imre Garlai
- Miklós Zoltai
- János Pásztor
