= Black Snow (1990 film) =

1990 film

- DVD cover
- Directed by: Xie Fei
- Written by: Liu Heng
- Produced by: Li Yongxin
- Starring: Cai Hongxiang; Jiang Wen; Lin Cheng
- Cinematography: Xiao Feng
- Edited by: Zhao Qihua
- Production company: Beijing Youth Film Studio
- Release dates: 14 February 1990 (Berlin); 13 April 1990 (China)
- Running time: 107 minutes
- Country: China
- Language: Mandarin

Black Snow (Chinese: 本命年; pinyin: běn mìng nián) is a 1990 Chinese drama film directed by Xie Fei. It was written and adapted from a novel by Liu Heng. It was entered into the 40th Berlin International Film Festival, where it won the Silver Bear for an outstanding single achievement. Although the English film title follows the original name of the novel, the Chinese film title 本命年 běnmìngnián means the year when someone is aged 12, 24, 36, and so on when the Twelve Terrestrial Branches come round again.

== Plot ==
The film captures the social impact of political change in China at the time. A semi-literate who was deprived of schooling during the Cultural Revolution, Li Huiquan, is released from labor camp. He arrives back in his native Beijing to find that he has no family or prospects or friends, just his underworld contacts trying to drag him back into a life of crime. His attempts to make good are continually thwarted. His street stall selling clothes puts him on the fringe of the black market, and he soon gets lured back into his old neighbourhood gangs. His disenchanted comrades include a nightclub chanteuse as well as an escaped convict. The film's lurking handheld camera visually presents realistic footage of a man destined for the past from which he left behind.

== Cast ==
- Cai Hongxiang as Cui Yongli
- Jiang Wen as Li Huiquan, nickname Quanzi
- Lin Cheng as Zhau Yaqiu
- Yue Hong
- Meng Jin
- Liu Xiaoning
- Liang Tian
- Fang Zige
- Yue Hong

== Reception ==
=== Awards ===
- Berlin International Film Festival, 1990
  - Fei Xie Silver Berlin Bear (won)
  - Fei Xie Golden Berlin Bear (nominated)
- Hundred Flowers Awards, 1990
  - Best Film (won) tied with Jue zhan zhi hou (1991)

== DVD release ==
In 2010, Black Snow was released as a DVD in a new High-Definition transfer and a booklet featuring essay by author and academic Professor Shaoyi Sun. It includes a 32-minute interview with Xie Fei, in which the director discusses a variety of topics from his training in cinema, to the Cultural Revolution and his approach to teaching filmmaking.
