= Kettévált mennyezet =

- Directed by: Pál Gábor
- Release date: 1982
- Country: Hungary

Kettévált mennyezet is a Hungarian film directed by Pál Gábor which was released in 1982. The script was written by Endre Vészi and had the following starring actors: Juli Básti, Jan Nowicki and Gyula Szersén.
