= Agrigento =

Agrigento Girgenti / Giurgenti (Sicilian)
- Comune
- Comune di Agrigento
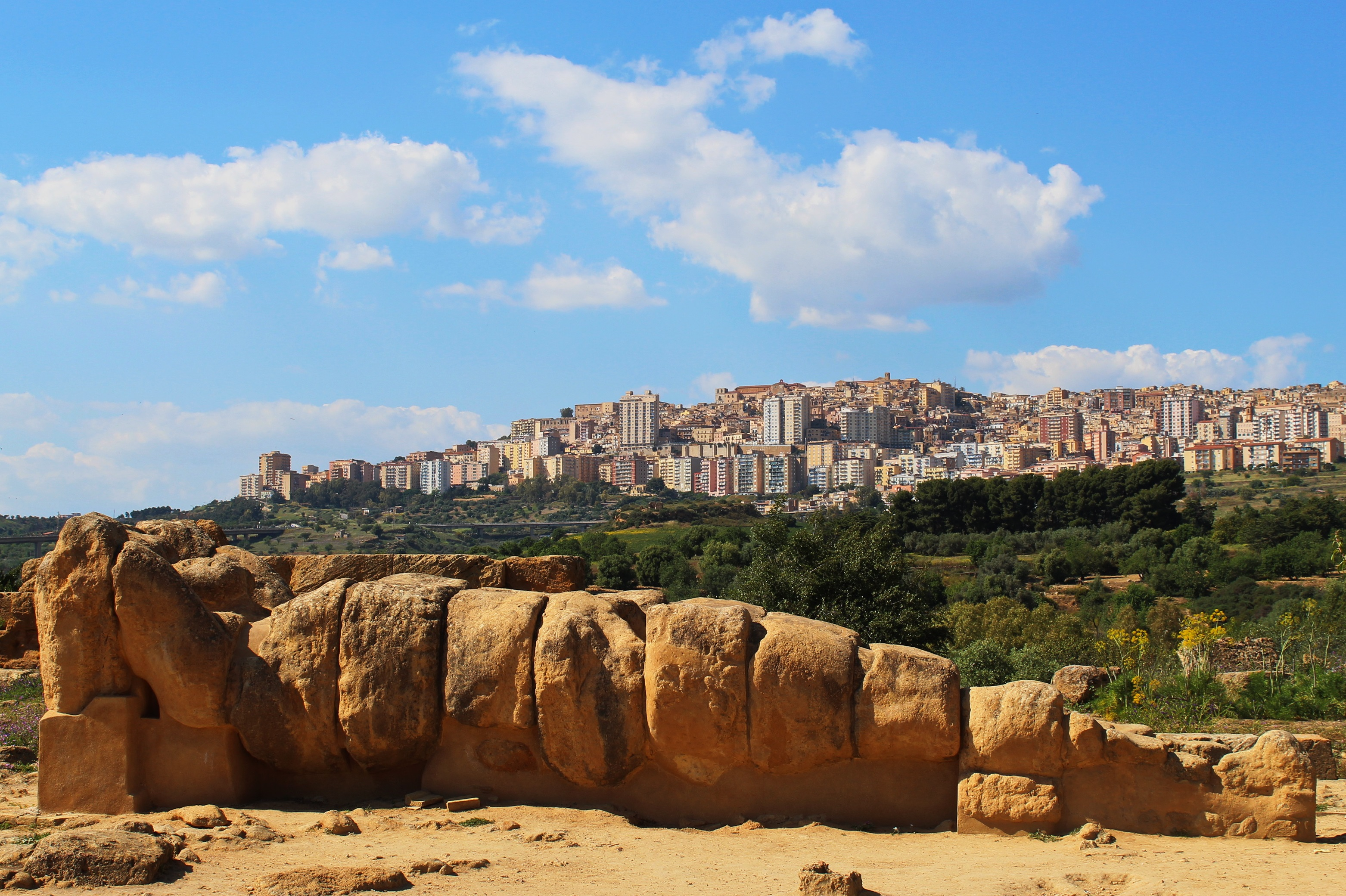
- Agrigento skyline seen from Valle dei Templi

- Flag Coat of arms
- Motto: Signat Agrigentum mirabilis aula gigantum
- Location within Italy Location within Sicily
- Coordinates: 37°18′45″N 13°34′30″E
- Country: Italy
- Region: Sicily
- Province: Agrigento (AG)
- Frazioni: Fontanelle, Giardina Gallotti, Monserrato, Montaperto, San Leone, Villaggio La Loggia, Villaggio Mosè, Villaggio Peruzzo, Villaseta

Government
  - Mayor: Michele Sodano (Ind)

Area
  - Total: 245.32 km^{2} (94.72 sq mi)
- Elevation: 230 m (750 ft)

Population (2025)
  - Total: 55,227
  - Density: 225.12/km^{2} (583.06/sq mi)
- Demonyms: Agrigentines or Girgintans agrigentini or girgentini (Italian) giurgintani (Sicilian)
- Time zone: UTC+1 (CET)
  - Summer (DST): UTC+2 (CEST)
- Postal code: 92100
- Dialing code: 0922
- ISTAT code: 084001
- Patron saint: St. Gerland (Gerlando)
- Saint day: 25 February
- Website: Official website

Agrigento (Italian: [aɡriˈdʒɛnto]; Sicilian: Girgenti [dʒɪɾˈdʒɛndɪ] or Giurgenti [dʒʊɾˈdʒɛndɪ]) (Note: Ancient Greek: Ἀκράγας, romanized: Akrágas; Latin: Agrigentum or Acragas; Punic: 𐤀𐤂𐤓𐤂𐤍𐤕, romanized: ʾgrgnt; Arabic: كركنت, romanized: Kirkant, or جرجنت, Jirjant.) is a city on the southern coast of the autonomous island region of Sicily in Italy, capital of the province of Agrigento. As of 2025, with a population of 55,227, it is also the largest city in the province, 10th-largest in Sicily and 115th-largest in Italy.

Founded around 582 BC by Greek colonists from Gela, Agrigento, then known as Akragas, was one of the leading cities during the golden age of Ancient Greece. The city flourished under Theron's leadership in the 5th century BC, marked by ambitious public works and the construction of renowned temples.

Despite periods of dormancy during the Punic Wars, Agrigento emerged as one of Sicily's largest cities in the Republican era. During the Principate, Agrigento's strategic port and diverse economic ventures, including sulfur mining, trade and agriculture, sustained its importance throughout the high and late Empire. Economic prosperity persisted from the 3rd to the 4th centuries AD, but excavations indicate a decline in activity after the 7th century.

Agrigento is also the birthplace of several notable personalities, including Empedocles (5th century BC), the Ancient Greek pre-Socratic philosopher, who was a citizen of ancient Akragas, and Luigi Pirandello (1867–1936), dramatist and recipient of the Nobel Prize in Literature, who was born at contrada u Càvusu in Agrigento.

Parts of Agrigento were designated as a UNESCO World Heritage Site Archaeological Area of Agrigento in 1997, and the city was named Italian capital of culture for 2025.

== History ==
Akragas was founded on a plateau overlooking the sea, with two nearby rivers, the Hypsas and the Acragas, after which the settlement was originally named. A ridge, which offered a degree of natural fortification, links a hill to the north, called Colle di Girgenti, with another, called Rupe Atenea, to the east. According to Thucydides, it was founded around 582–580 BC by Greek colonists from Gela in eastern Sicily, with further colonists from Crete and Rhodes. The founders (oikistai) of the new city were Aristonous and Pystilus. It was the last of the major Greek colonies in Sicily to be founded.

=== Archaic period ===
The territory under Akragas's control expanded to comprise the whole area between the Platani and the Salso, and reached deep into the Sicilian interior. Greek literary sources connect this expansion with military campaigns. Still, archaeological evidence indicates that this was a much longer-term process which reached its peak only in the early fifth century BC. Most other Greek settlements in Sicily experienced similar territorial expansion in this period. Excavations at a range of sites in this region inhabited by the indigenous Sican people, such as Monte Sabbucina, Gibil-Gabil, Vasallaggi, San Angelo Muxano, and Mussomeli, show signs of the adoption of Greek culture. It is disputed how much of this expansion was carried out by violence and how much by commerce and acculturation. The territorial expansion provided land for the Greek settlers to farm, native enslaved people to work these farms, and control of the overland route from Acragas to the city of Himera on the northern coast of Sicily. This was the main land route from the Straits of Sicily to the Tyrrhenian Sea, and Acragas' control of it was a key factor in its economic prosperity in the sixth and fifth centuries BC, which became proverbial. Famously, Plato, upon seeing the living standard of the inhabitants, was said to have remarked that "they build like they intend to live forever, yet eat like this is their last day." Perhaps as a result of this wealth, Acragas was one of the first communities in Sicily to begin minting its own coinage, around 520 BC.

Around 570 BC, the city came under the control of Phalaris, a semi-legendary figure, who was remembered as the archetypal tyrant, said to have killed his enemies by burning them alive inside a bronze bull. In ancient literary sources, he is linked to military campaigns of territorial expansion, but this is probably anachronistic. He ruled until around 550 BC. The political history of Acragas in the second half of the sixth century is unknown, except for the names of two leaders, Alcamenes and Alcander. Acragas also expanded westwards over the course of the sixth century BC, leading to a rivalry with Selinus, the next Greek city to the west. The Selinuntines founded the city of Heraclea Minoa at the mouth of the Platani river, halfway between the two settlements, in the mid-sixth century BC, but the Acragantines conquered it around 500 BC.

=== Emmenid period ===
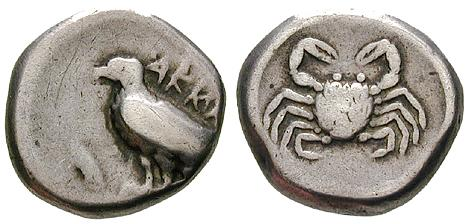
Didrachm of Acragas, 490–483 BC

Theron, a member of the Emmenid family, made himself tyrant of Acragas around 488 BC. He allied with Gelon, tyrant of Gela and Syracuse. Around 483 BC, Theron invaded and conquered Himera, Acragas' neighbour to the north. The tyrant of Himera, Terillus, joined his son-in-law, Anaxilas of Rhegium, and the Selinuntines in calling on the Carthaginians to come and restore Terillus to power. The Carthaginians invaded in 480 BC, the first of the Greco-Punic Wars, but they were defeated by the combined forces of Theron and Gelon at the Battle of Himera. As a result, Acragas was affirmed in its control of the central portion of Sicily, an area of around 3,500 km^{2}. Many enormous construction projects were carried out in the Valle dei Templi at this time, including the Temple of Olympian Zeus, which was one of the largest Greek temples ever built, and the construction of a massive Kolymbethra reservoir. According to Diodorus Siculus, they were built in commemoration of the Battle of Himera, with prisoners captured in the war used as slave labour. Archaeological evidence indicates that the boom in monumental construction began before the battle and continued afterward. A major reconstruction of the city walls on a monumental scale also took place in this period. Theron sent teams to compete in the Olympic games and other Panhellenic competitions in mainland Greece. Several poems by Pindar and Simonides commemorated victories by Theron and other Acragantines, which provide insights into Acragantine identity and ideology at this time. Greek literary sources generally praise Theron as a good tyrant, but accuse his son Thrasydaeus, who succeeded him in 472 BC, of violence and oppression. Shortly after Theron's death, Hiero I of Syracuse (brother and successor of Gelon) invaded Acragas and overthrew Thrasydaeus. The literary sources say that Acragas then became a democracy, but in practice, it seems to have been dominated by the civic aristocracy.

=== Classical period ===
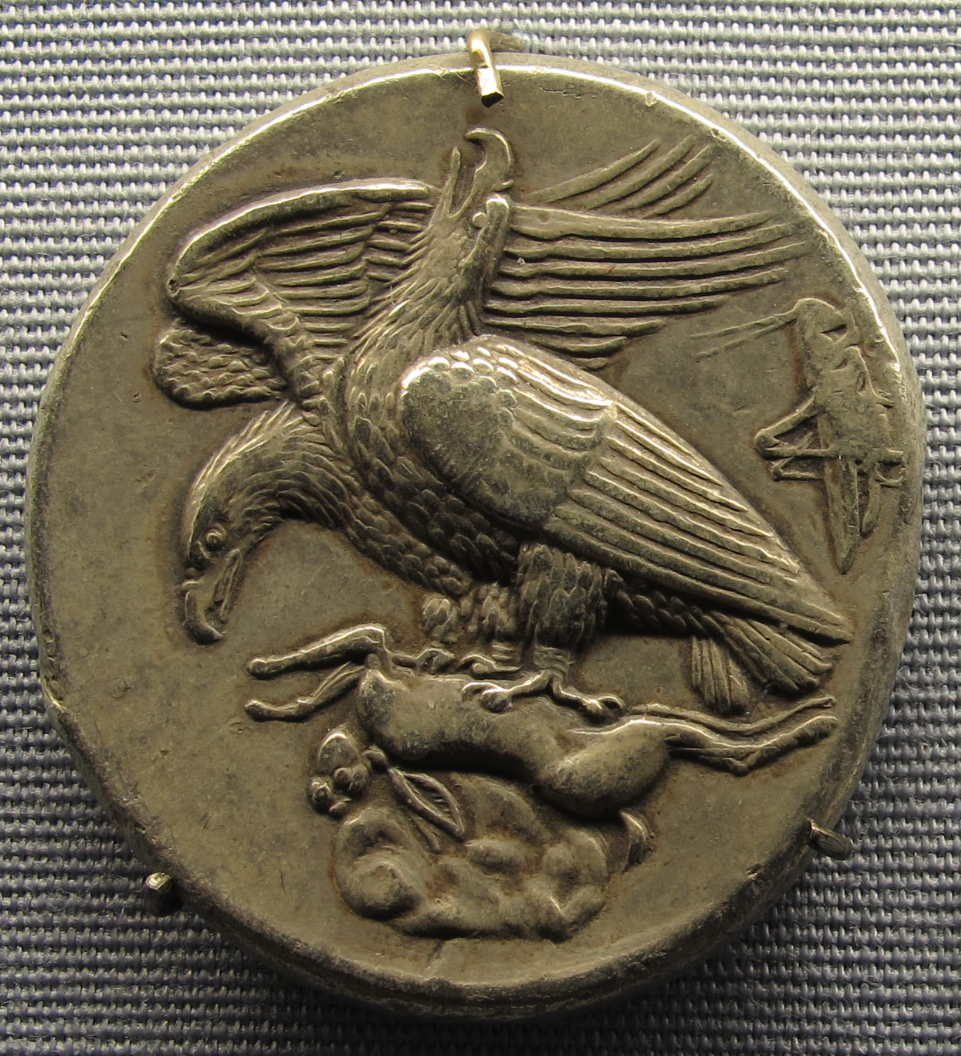
Tetradrachm of Acragas, c. 410 BC.

The period after the fall of the Emmenids is not well-known. An oligarchic group called "the thousand" held power for a few years in the mid-fifth century BC, but was overthrown – the literary tradition attributes a decisive role in this revolution to the philosopher Empedocles. However, some modern scholars have doubted this. In 451 BC, Ducetius, leader of a Sicel state opposed to the expansion of Syracuse and other Greeks into the interior of Sicily, invaded Acragantine territory and conquered an outpost called Motyum. The Syracusans defeated and captured Ducetius in 450, but subsequently allowed him to go into exile. Outraged by this comparatively light punishment, the Acragantines went to war with Syracuse. They were defeated in a battle on the Salso river, which left Syracuse the pre-eminent power in eastern Sicily. The defeat was serious enough that Acragas ceased minting coinage for several years.

Ancient sources described Acragas as a very large city at this time. Diodorus Siculus says the population was 200,000, of whom 20,000 were citizens. Diogenes Laertius put the population at an incredible 800,000. Some modern scholars have accepted Diodorus' numbers, but they seem to be far too high. Jos de Waele suggests a population of 16,000–18,000 citizens, while Franco de Angelis estimates a total population of around 30,000-40,000.

When Athens undertook the Sicilian Expedition against Syracuse from 415 to 413 BC, Acragas remained neutral. In 406 BC, however, the city was captured and sacked by Carthaginian forces, marking a decisive break in its classical prosperity.

=== Hellenistic period ===
Archaeological Area of Agrigento
UNESCO World Heritage Site
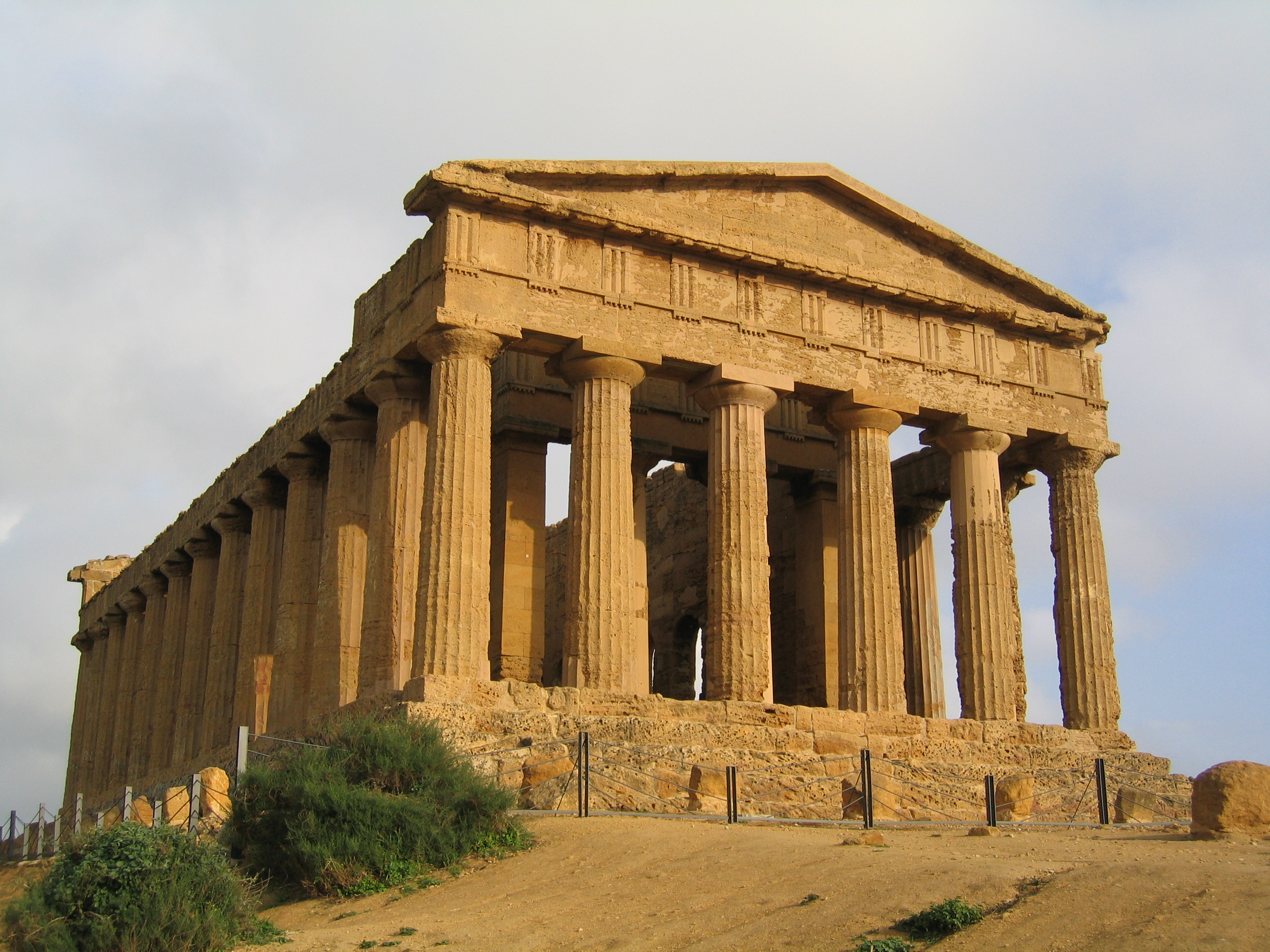
- Temple of Concordia
- Interactive map of Archaeological Area of Agrigento
- Criteria: Cultural: i, ii, iii, iv
- Reference: 831
- Inscription: 1997 (21st Session)
- Area: 321.11 ha (793.5 acres)
- Buffer zone: 1,866.15 ha (4,611.4 acres)

In the later fourth century BC, conditions in Greek Sicily shifted again as Timoleon’s intervention (344–337 BC) led to the restoration and repopulation of numerous communities that had been depleted by decades of warfare and stasis. A central problem concerns the interpretation of Plutarch’s account (Timoleon 35.2), which states that settlers from “Elaia” took part in the restoration of Akragas. Earlier scholars commonly identified this Elaia with the Ionian city in southern Italy. They inferred Ionian participation in the refounding of Akragas, but as archaeological excavations revealed no trace of Ionian influence at Akragas in the fourth century BC, this interpretation becomes problematic. Alternative readings, identifying Plutarch’s “Elaia” should be identified with an Epirote city in Thesprotia rather than the Italian Elia have been put forward, supported by a grant of proxenia by the Molossians to the people of Akragas with uncertain dating. Giacomo Manganaro favored the manuscript reading Elaías (Ἐλαίας) rather than Eleás (Ἐλεᾶς), which he took to support identification with an Epirote Elaea rather than the Italian Elea. He further suggested that colonists from this Epirote city may have sailed to Sicily following the devastation of their territory by Philip II of Macedon in 342 BC.

By the early Hellenistic period, Akragas’ autonomy was increasingly constrained by the re-emergence of Syracusan power under Agathokles. During Agathokles’ wars with Carthage and his African expedition, Diodorus presents Akragas as attempting to capitalize on Syracusan distraction by positioning itself as a leader of anti-Syracusan, "liberation" politics among Sicilian Greek communities. The Akragantines elected Xenodikos as general; he initially achieved successes, bringing many other Sicilian cities, including Gela and Enna, into alignment with Akragas’ coalition.

The momentum did not last. Syracusan forces commanded by Leptines and Demophilus repeatedly defeated the Akragantines in the field. Following a Syracusan victory outside Akragas, Leptines pursued Akragantine troops into the city. Xenodikos was indicted and then went into exile. De Lisle concludes that Syracusan battlefield success effectively terminated Akragas’ independent policy, with Xenodikos expelled and the Akragantine exiles previously resident at Syracuse likely reincorporated into the civic body.

During the early 3rd century BC, a tyrant named Phintias declared himself king of Akragas and controlled several other cities. His kingdom was, however, not long-lived.

=== Roman period ===
The city was disputed between the Romans and the Carthaginians during the First Punic War. The Romans laid siege to the city in 262 BC and captured it after defeating a Carthaginian relief force in 261 BC and sold the population into slavery. Although the Carthaginians recaptured the city in 255 BC, the final peace settlement ceded Punic Sicily, including Akragas, to Rome. It suffered badly during the Second Punic War (218–201 BC) when both Rome and Carthage fought to control it. The Romans eventually captured Akragas in 210 BC and renamed it Agrigentum, although it remained a largely Greek-speaking community for centuries thereafter. It became prosperous again under Roman rule. In the 2nd century BC, Scipio Africanus Minor bestowed upon the city a statue of Apollo by Myron, housed in the Temple of Asclepius as a symbol of their alliance during the Third Punic War.

Cicero noted Agrigentum as a civitas decumana and socius, highlighting its loyal service in the Third Punic War. He ranked Agrigentum among Sicily's largest cities, emphasizing its pivotal port and role in Roman governance, including hosting the governor's assize circuit. Additionally, he mentioned a sizable population of Roman citizens coexisting harmoniously with the Greek populace, likely engaged in commerce linked to the port.

An inscription indicates that the city was promoted to colonia status by Septimius Severus and renamed "Colonia Septimia Augusta Agrigentorum."

A resilient Christian community endured into late antiquity, although archaeological evidence suggests a decline in activity after the 7th century, possibly due to disrupted trade routes following the Arab conquest of Carthage in AD 698.

=== Middle Ages ===
After the fall of the Western Roman Empire, the city successively passed into the hands of the Vandalic Kingdom, the Ostrogothic Kingdom of Italy, and then the Byzantine Empire. During this period, the inhabitants of Agrigentum largely abandoned the lower parts of the city and moved to the former acropolis, at the top of the hill. The reasons for this move are unclear, but they were probably related to the destructive coastal raids by the Saracens and other peoples around this time. In 828 AD the Saracens captured the diminished remnant of the city; the Arabic form of its name became كِركَنت (Kirkant) or جِرجَنت (Jirjant).

Following the Norman conquest of Sicily, the city changed its name to the Norman version Girgenti. In 1087, Norman Count Roger I established a Latin bishopric in the city. Normans built the Castello di Agrigento to control the area. The population declined during much of the medieval period but revived somewhat after the 18th century.

=== Jewish history ===
The earliest record of Jews in Agrigento is of their conversion to Christianity under the pontificate of Gregory the Great. The community is mentioned in the Cairo Geniza circa 1060. The Jewish presence in Agrigento did not survive the expulsion of the Jews in 1492, as at the time the territory was under Spanish rule.

=== Modern period ===
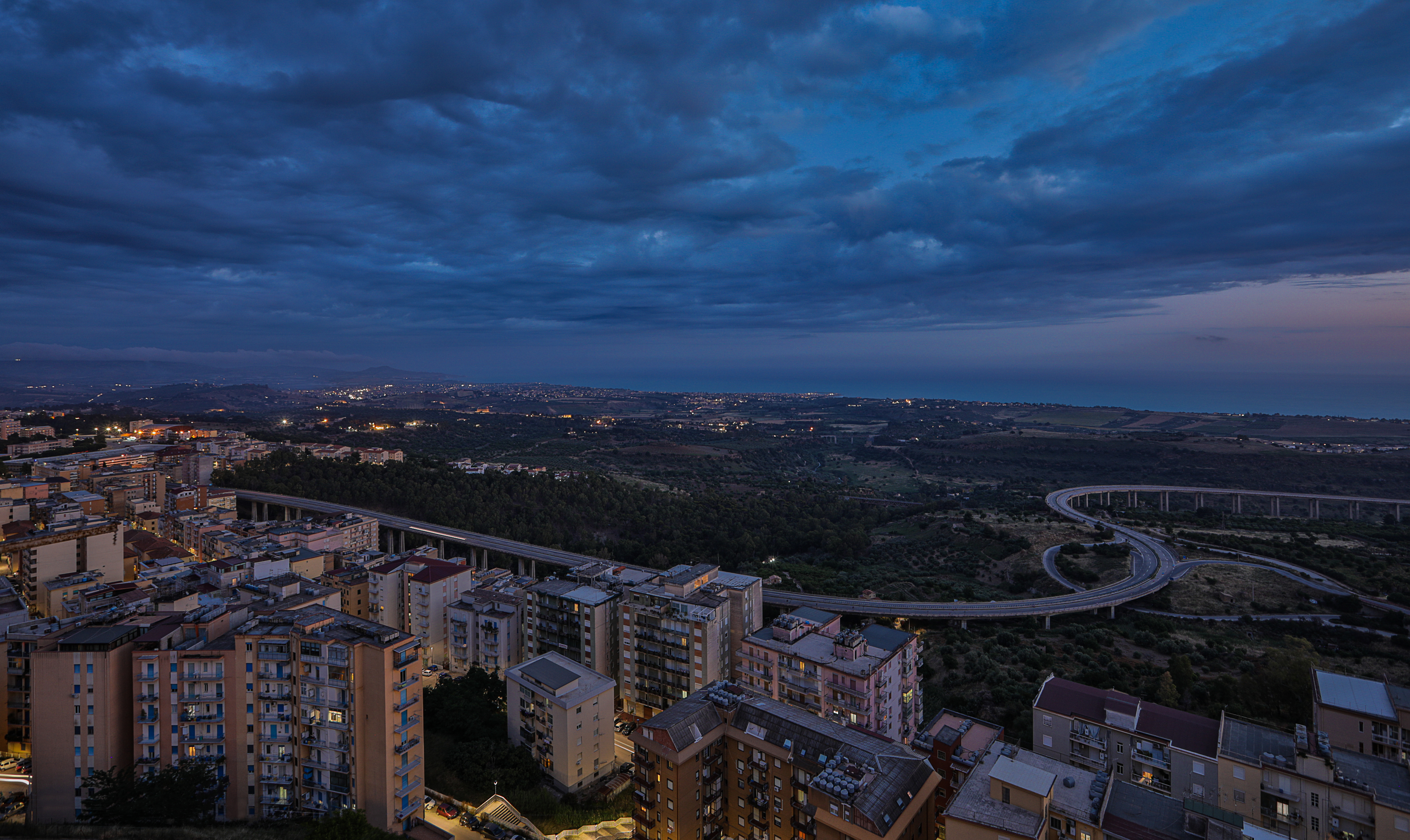
Viaduct Akragas, opened in 1970

In 1860, as in the rest of Sicily, the inhabitants supported the arrival of Giuseppe Garibaldi during the Expedition of the Thousand (one of the most dramatic events of the Unification of Italy) which marked the end of Bourbon rule. In 1927, Benito Mussolini through the "Decree Law n. 159, 12 July 1927", introduced the current Italianized version of the Latin name. The decision remains controversial as a symbol of Fascism and the eradication of local history. Following the suggestion of Andrea Camilleri, a Sicilian writer of Agrigentine origin, the historic city centre was renamed to the Sicilian name "Girgenti" in 2016. The city suffered a number of destructive bombing raids during World War II.

== Climate ==
Agrigento has a hot-summer Mediterranean climate (Csa), according to the Köppen climate classification.

Climate data for Agrigento, elevation 313 m (1,027 ft)
Month	Jan	Feb	Mar	Apr	May	Jun	Jul	Aug	Sep	Oct	Nov	Dec	Year
Record high °C (°F)	22.4 (72.3)	24.2 (75.6)	25.5 (77.9)	29.7 (85.5)	35.0 (95.0)	37.2 (99.0)	41.5 (106.7)	39.6 (103.3)	39.9 (103.8)	32.5 (90.5)	29.5 (85.1)	26.5 (79.7)	41.5 (106.7)
Mean daily maximum °C (°F)	14.4 (57.9)	14.7 (58.5)	16.4 (61.5)	18.6 (65.5)	23.1 (73.6)	27.1 (80.8)	29.9 (85.8)	30.0 (86.0)	27.0 (80.6)	23.3 (73.9)	19.1 (66.4)	15.7 (60.3)	21.6 (70.9)
Daily mean °C (°F)	11.0 (51.8)	11.2 (52.2)	12.6 (54.7)	14.5 (58.1)	18.8 (65.8)	22.7 (72.9)	25.4 (77.7)	25.7 (78.3)	22.9 (73.2)	19.4 (66.9)	15.5 (59.9)	12.4 (54.3)	17.7 (63.8)
Mean daily minimum °C (°F)	7.7 (45.9)	7.6 (45.7)	8.8 (47.8)	10.5 (50.9)	14.5 (58.1)	18.2 (64.8)	21.0 (69.8)	21.4 (70.5)	18.9 (66.0)	15.6 (60.1)	11.9 (53.4)	9.0 (48.2)	13.8 (56.8)
Record low °C (°F)	−1.0 (30.2)	0.0 (32.0)	1.2 (34.2)	1.7 (35.1)	7.5 (45.5)	12.1 (53.8)	14.2 (57.6)	15.3 (59.5)	11.6 (52.9)	7.1 (44.8)	4.2 (39.6)	0.0 (32.0)	−1.0 (30.2)
Average precipitation mm (inches)	66 (2.6)	56 (2.2)	44 (1.7)	37 (1.5)	20 (0.8)	5 (0.2)	2 (0.1)	9 (0.4)	38 (1.5)	86 (3.4)	64 (2.5)	70 (2.8)	497 (19.7)
Source: Regione Siciliana

== Demographics ==
Historical population
Year	Pop.	±%
1861	17,828	—
1871	20,180	+13.2%
1881	21,219	+5.1%
1901	24,872	+17.2%
1911	26,147	+5.1%
1921	30,074	+15.0%
1931	28,677	−4.6%
1936	32,951	+14.9%
1951	40,491	+22.9%
1961	47,919	+18.3%
1971	49,213	+2.7%
1981	51,325	+4.3%
1991	55,283	+7.7%
2001	54,619	−1.2%
2011	58,323	+6.8%
2021	55,849	−4.2%
Source: ISTAT

As of 2025, Agrigento has a population of 55,227, of whom 49.0% are male, and 51.0% are female. Minors make up 14.5% of the population, and seniors make up 24.7%, compared to the Italian average of 14.9% and 24.7%, respectively.

As of 2024, the foreign-born population is 3,925, or 6.7% of the total population. The 5 largest foreign nationalities are Moroccans (504), Senegalese (441), Romanians (370), Germans (300) and Tunisians (249).

Foreign population by country of birth (2024)
Country	Population
Morocco	504
Senegal	441
Romania	370
Germany	300
Tunisia	249
Belgium	223
Bangladesh	129
Nigeria	115
France	113
China	80
United Kingdom	79
The Gambia	74
Argentina	68
Somalia	67
Ukraine	63

== Economy ==
Agrigento is a major tourist centre due to its archaeological legacy. It also serves as an agricultural centre for the surrounding region. Sulphur and potash were mined locally from Minoan times until the 1970s, and were exported worldwide from the nearby harbour of Porto Empedocle (named after the philosopher Empedocles, who lived in ancient Akragas). In 2010, the unemployment rate in Agrigento was 19.2%, almost twice the national average.

== Infrastructure and transport ==
=== Railways ===
In Agrigento, there are three railway stations: the Agrigento Centrale station, the Agrigento Bassa station, and the Tempio Vulcano station, managed by RFI. The tourist trains, organized by the FS Italiane Foundation, run along the Temple Tourist Railway and stop at all three stations. This service is active mainly in the summer months and connects the capital with Porto Empedocle and the archaeological park. The ordinary railway service, however, involves only the Agrigento Centrale and Agrigento Bassa stations.

In December 2023, the new railway connection between the city of temples and the "Falcone e Borsellino" airport in Palermo was inaugurated. The Trenitalia regional train begins on Monday, 11 December with its first service and, at the request of the Sicilian Region, 4 new daily services are operational, which connect Agrigento to the Palermo airport in approximately 2 hours and 30 minutes.

== Main sights ==
Ancient Akragas covers a huge area—much of which is still unexcavated today—but is exemplified by the famous Valle dei Templi ("Valley of the Temples", a misnomer, as it is a ridge, rather than a valley). This comprises a large sacred area on the south side of the ancient city where seven monumental Greek temples in the Doric style were constructed during the 6th and 5th centuries BC. Now excavated and partially restored, they constitute some of the largest and best-preserved ancient Greek buildings outside of Greece itself. They are listed as a World Heritage Site.

The best-preserved of the temples are two very similar buildings traditionally attributed to the goddesses Hera and Concordia (though there is no evidence for this). The latter temple is remarkably intact, having been converted into a Christian church in 597 AD. Both were constructed to a peripteral hexastyle design. The area around the Temple of Concordia was later reused by early Christians as a catacomb, with tombs hewn from the rocky cliffs and outcrops.

== Sport ==
ASD Akragas is the local association football club.

Fortitudo Agrigento is the local professional basketball club.

Founded in 1969, Polisportiva Amazzoni Agrigento played in the women's volleyball Serie A1 in the 90s, before eventually folding in 2005.

== Notable people ==
- Theron of Acragas, winner of a chariot race and recipient of Pindar's second and third Olympian Odes. More notably was a tyrant of Acragas in 488 BC.
- Empedocles (5th century BC), the Ancient Greek pre-Socratic philosopher, was a citizen of ancient Akragas.
- Tellias (Ancient Greek: Τελλίας) of Akragas, described in ancient sources as a hospitable man; when 500 horsemen were billeted with him during the winter, he gave each a tunic and cloak.
- Karkinos (Ancient Greek: Καρκίνος) of Akragas, a tragedian
- Tigellinus (born c. AD 10), a prefect of the Praetorian Guard and infamous associate of the Emperor Nero, belonged to a family of Greek descent in Agrigento. However, he may have been born in Scyllaceum in Southern Italy, where his father is supposed to have lived in exile.
- Faraj ben Salim (13th century), Jewish physician and translator for Charles I of Anjou.
- Paolo Girgenti (1767–1815), a painter active in Naples who served as president of the Accademia di Belle Arti di Napoli, was born in Agrigento.
- Luigi Pirandello (1867–1936), dramatist and Nobel Prize winner for literature, was born at contrada u Càvusu in Agrigento.
- Giovanni Leone (b. 1967), an Italian geophysicist and volcanologist, was born in Agrigento.
- Vinnie Paz (born 1977), the Italian-American rapper and lyricist behind Philadelphia underground hip-hop group Jedi Mind Tricks.
- Frankie Carbo (1904–1976), the Italian-American New York City Mafia soldier in the Lucchese crime family and promoter in professional boxing.
- Larry Page (born 1973), co-founder of Google, became an honorary citizen of Agrigento on August 4, 2017.

== Twin towns – sister cities ==
Agrigento is twinned with:

- Perm, Russia
- Tampa, United States
- Valenciennes, France

== Gallery ==
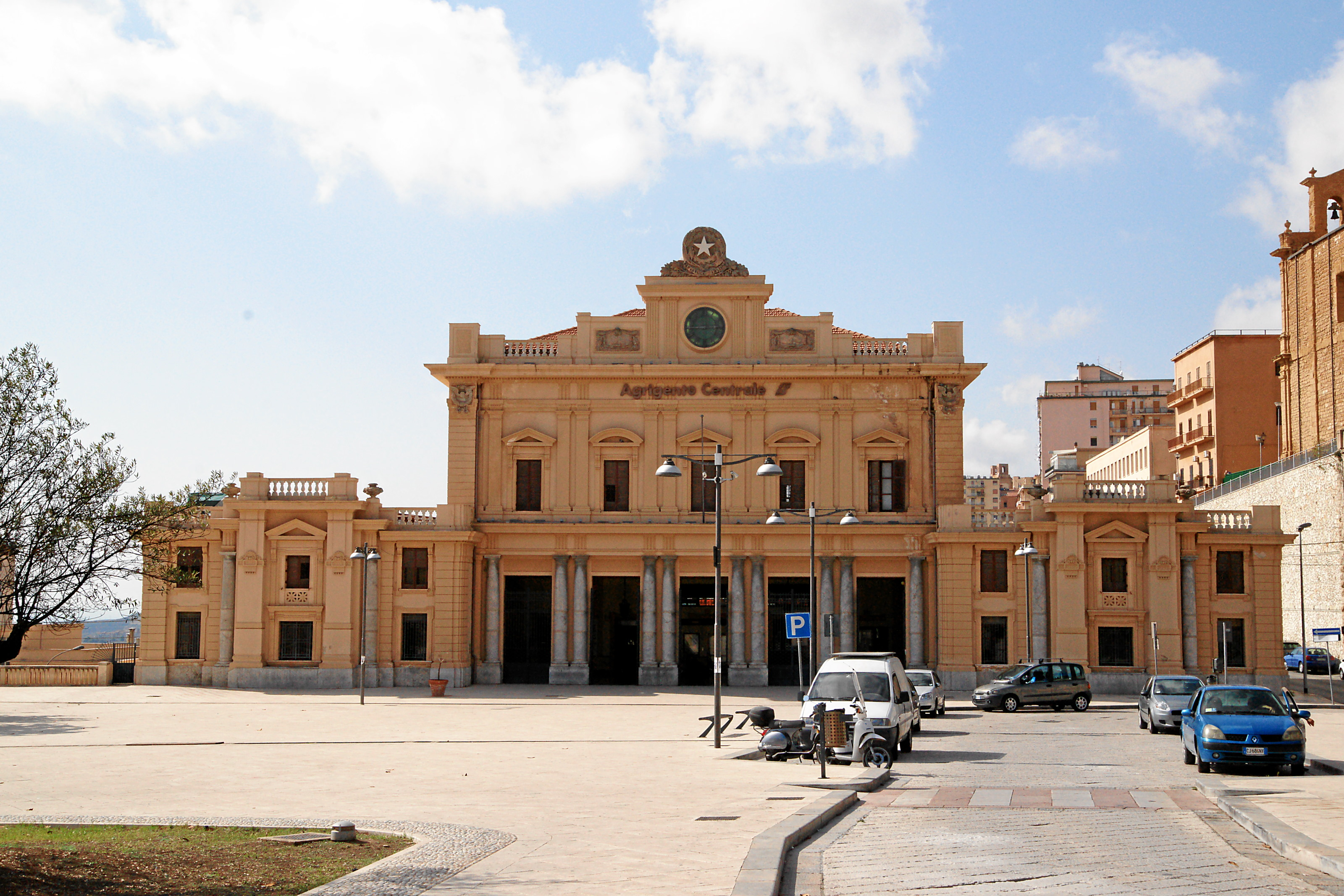
Central train station

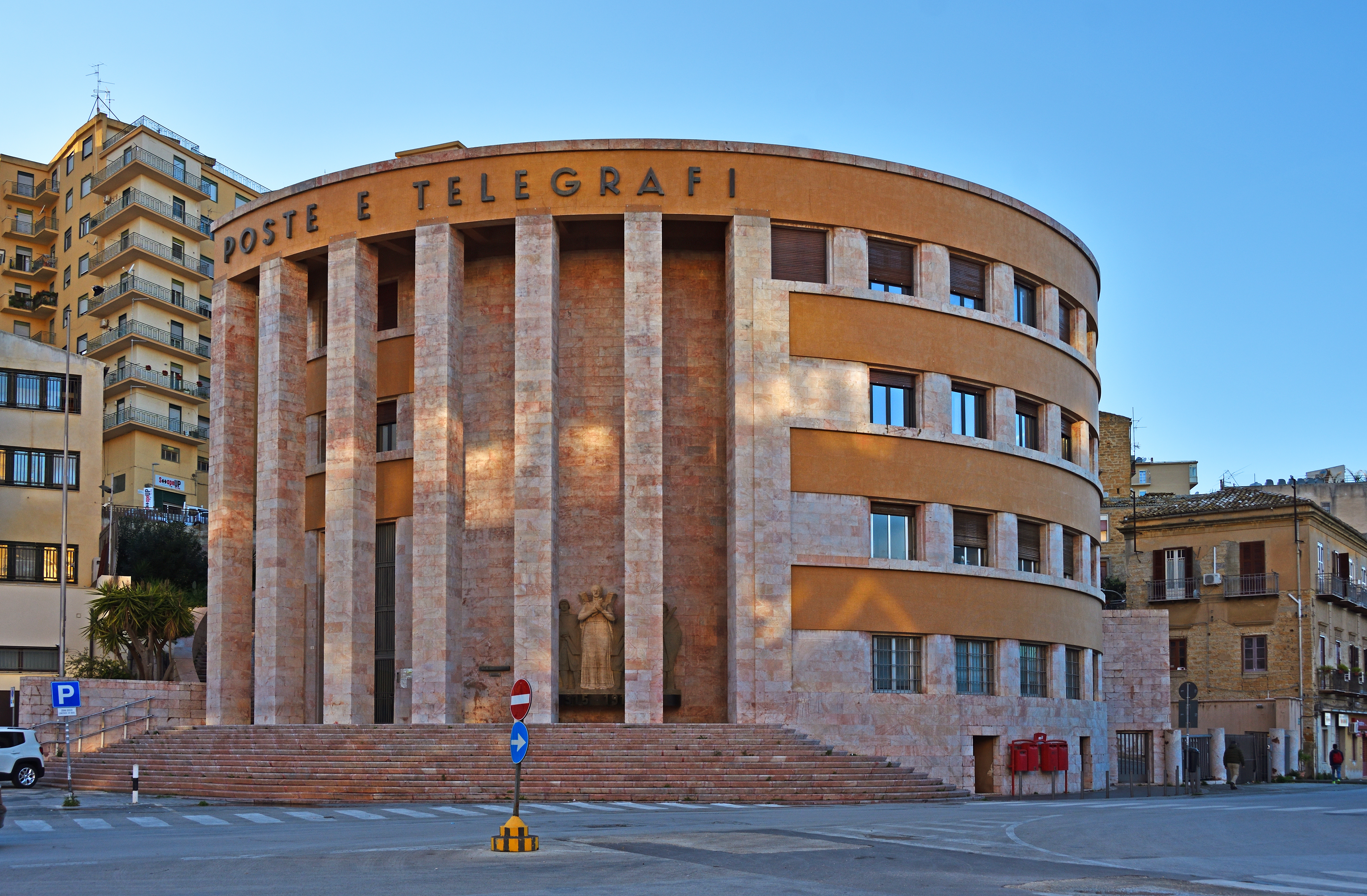
Central post office

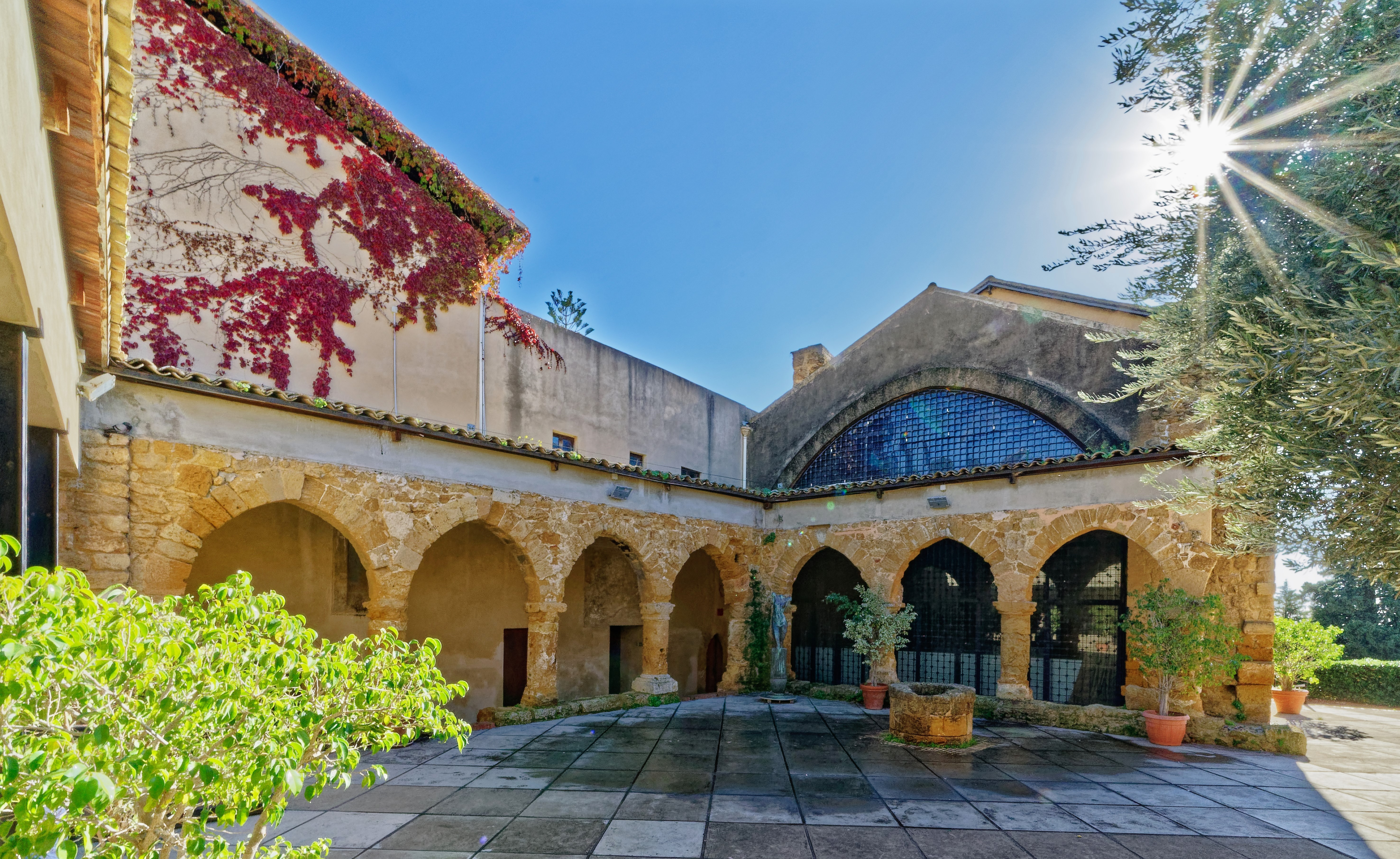
Archeological Museum

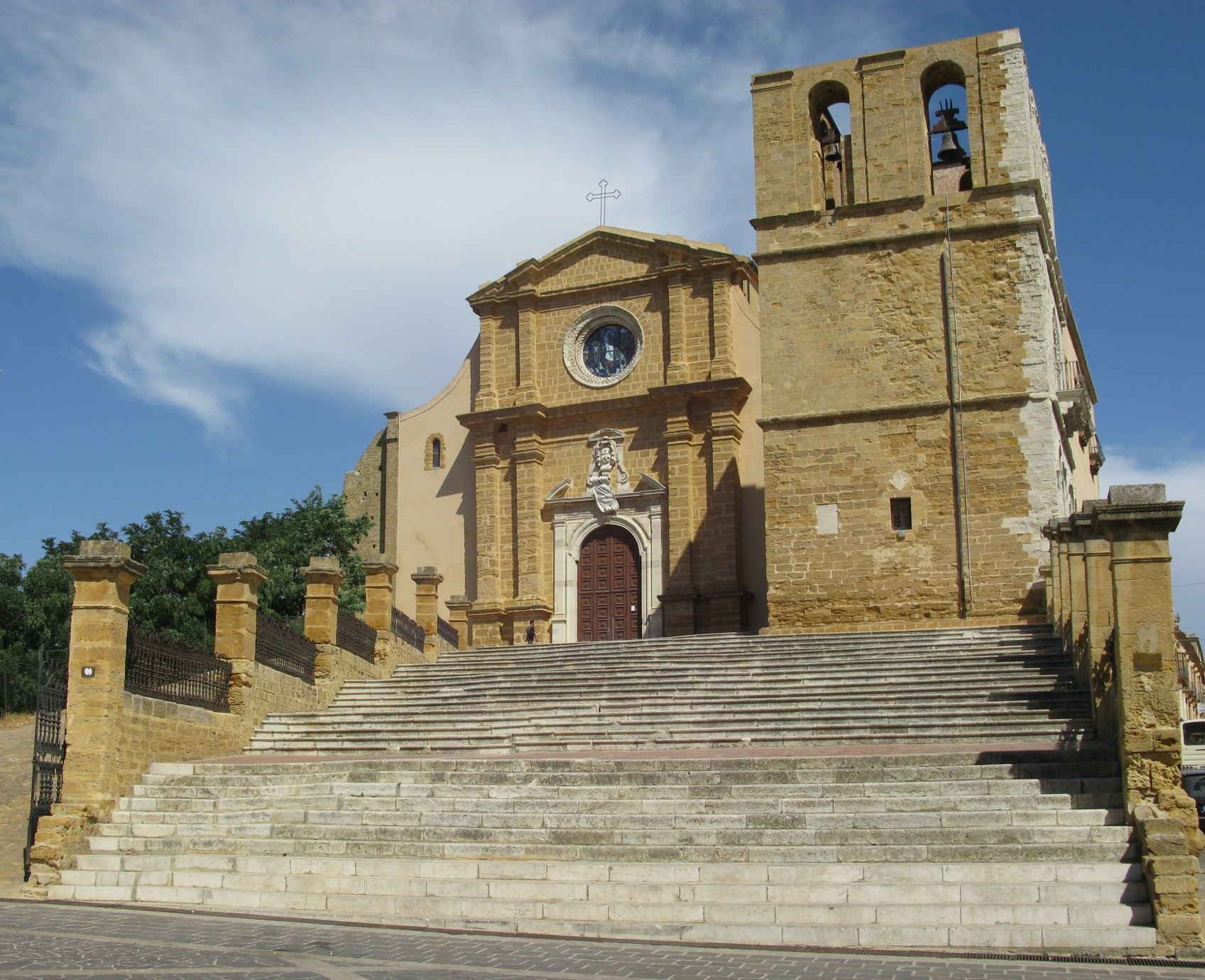
The cathedral

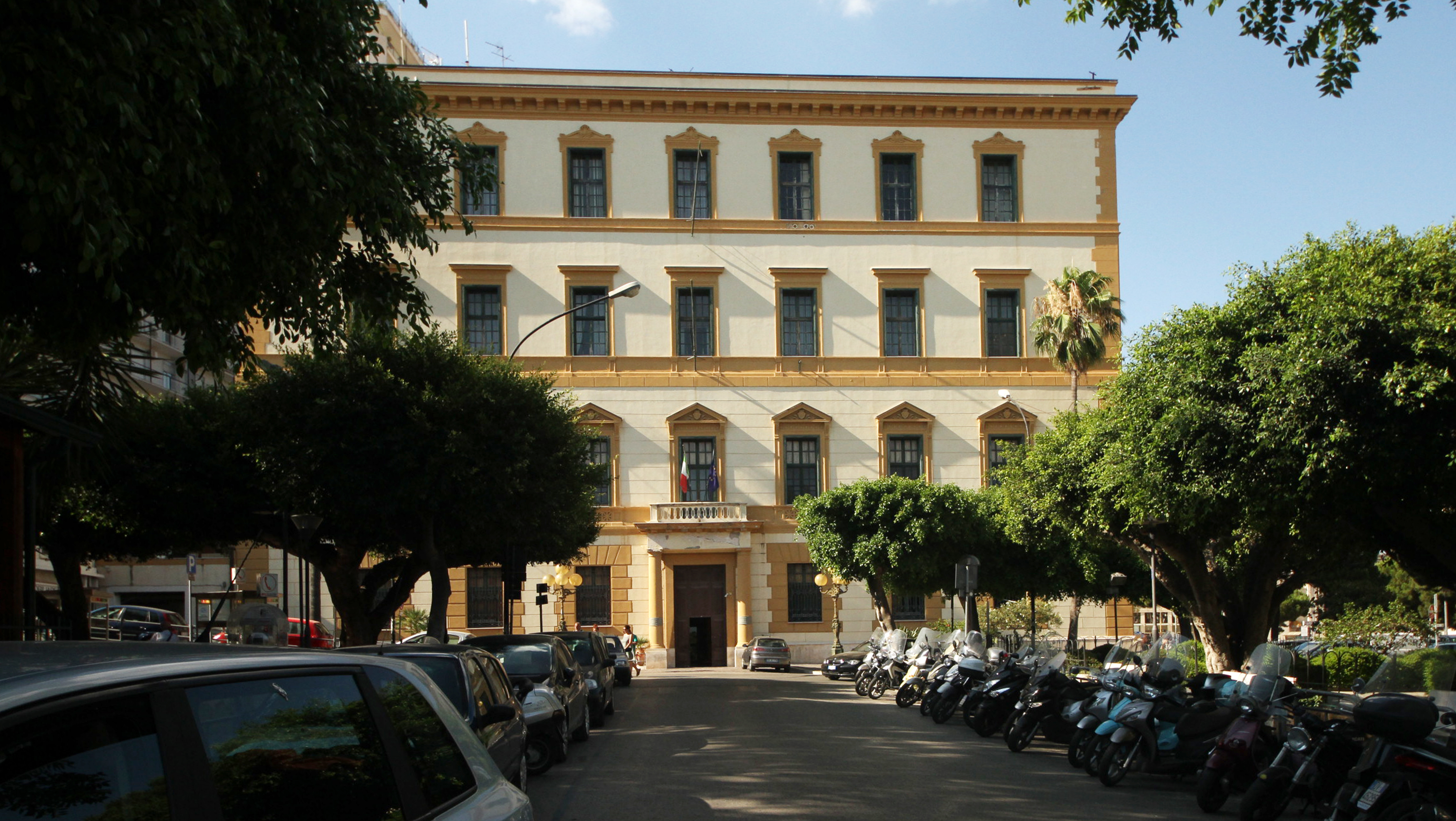
Prefecture's seat
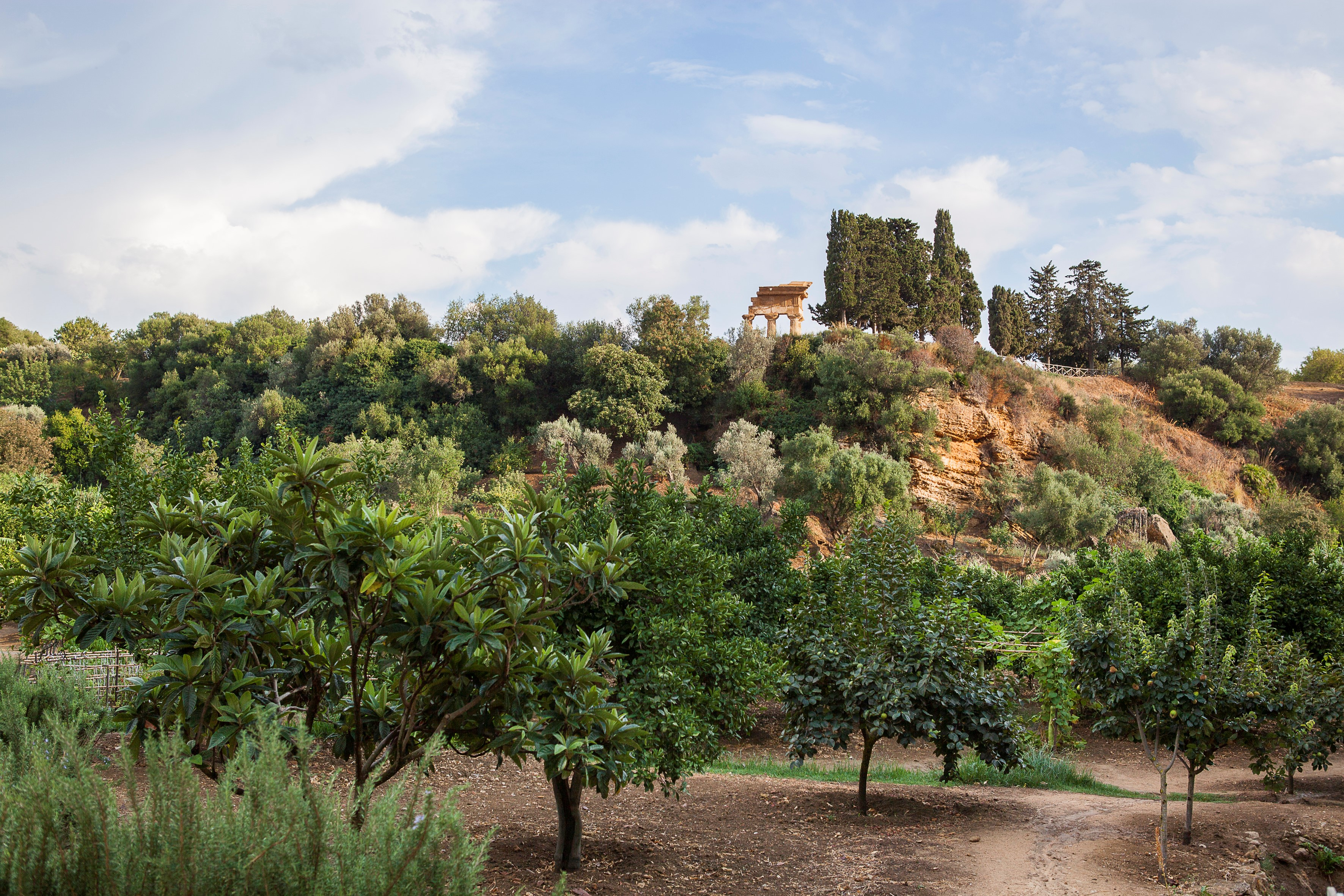
Kolymbethra Garden

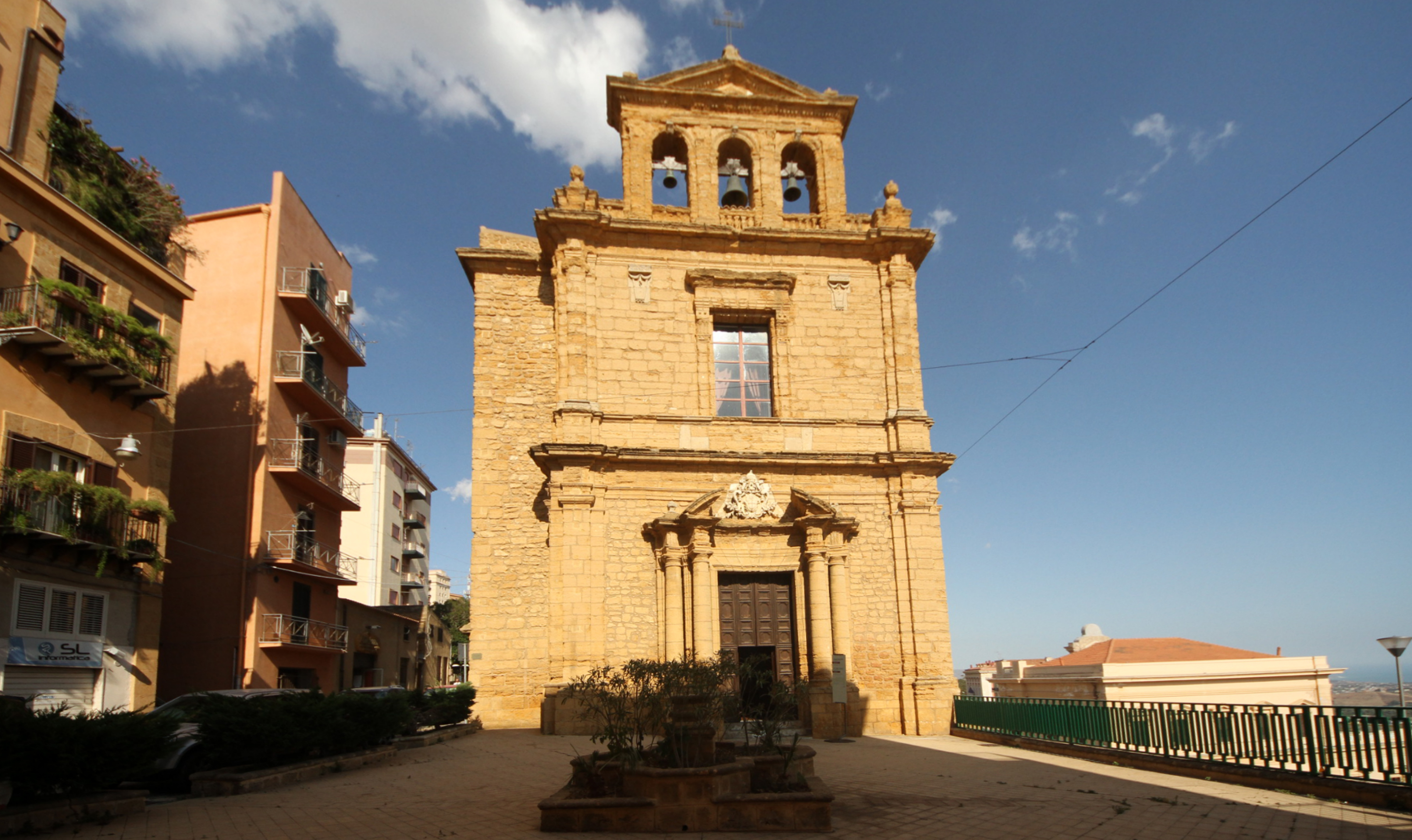
St. Peter's Church

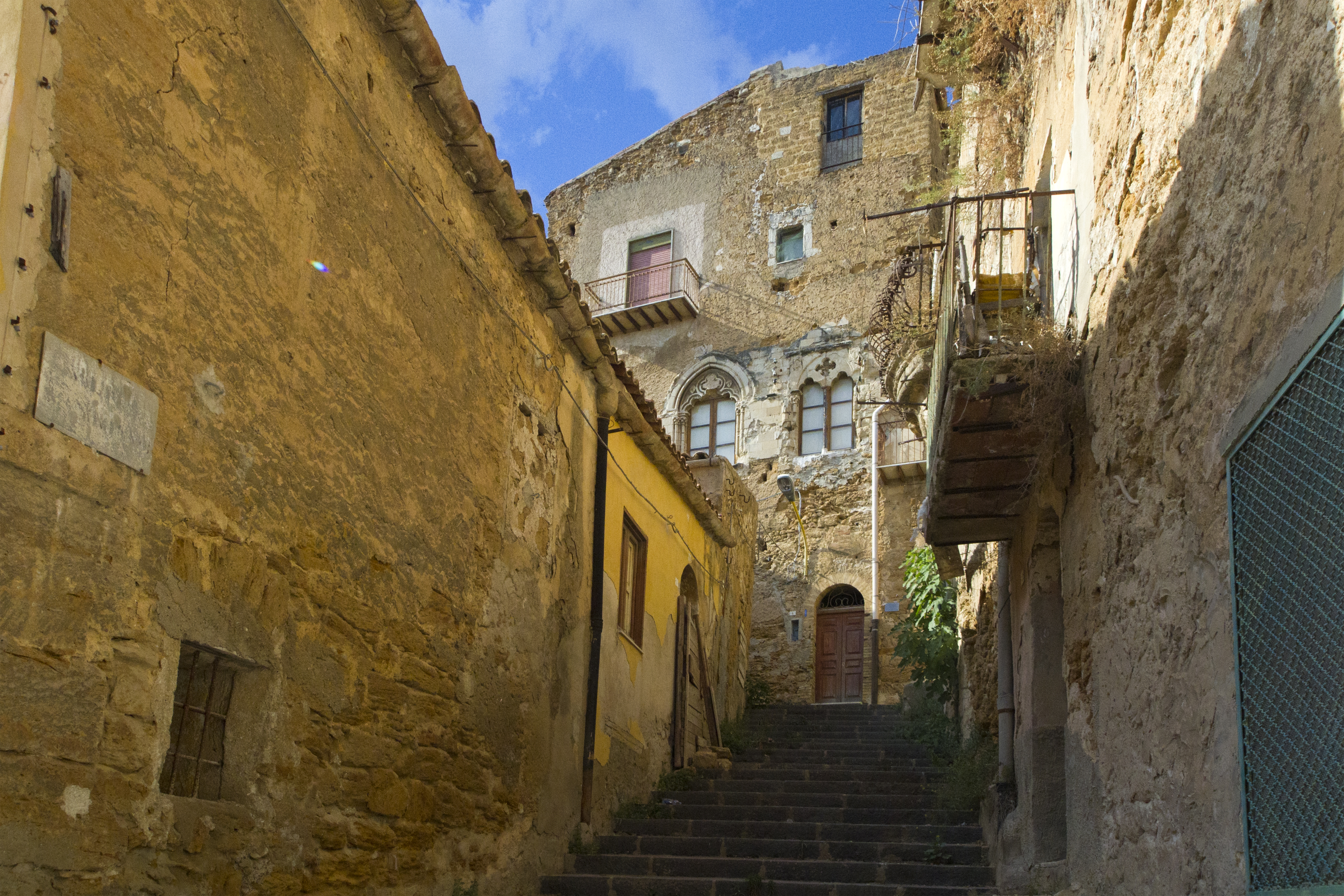
Old city centre

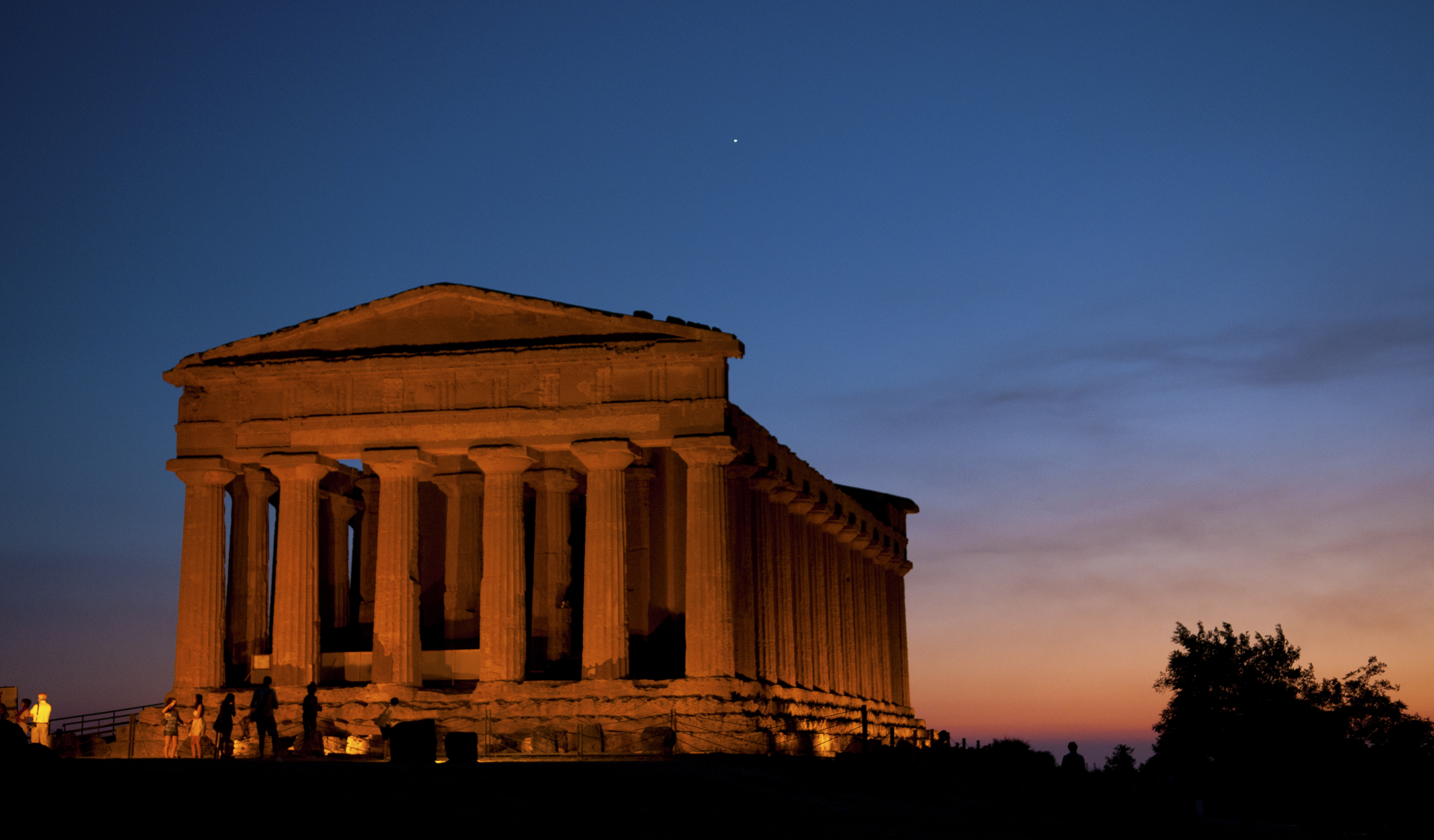
Valle dei Templi

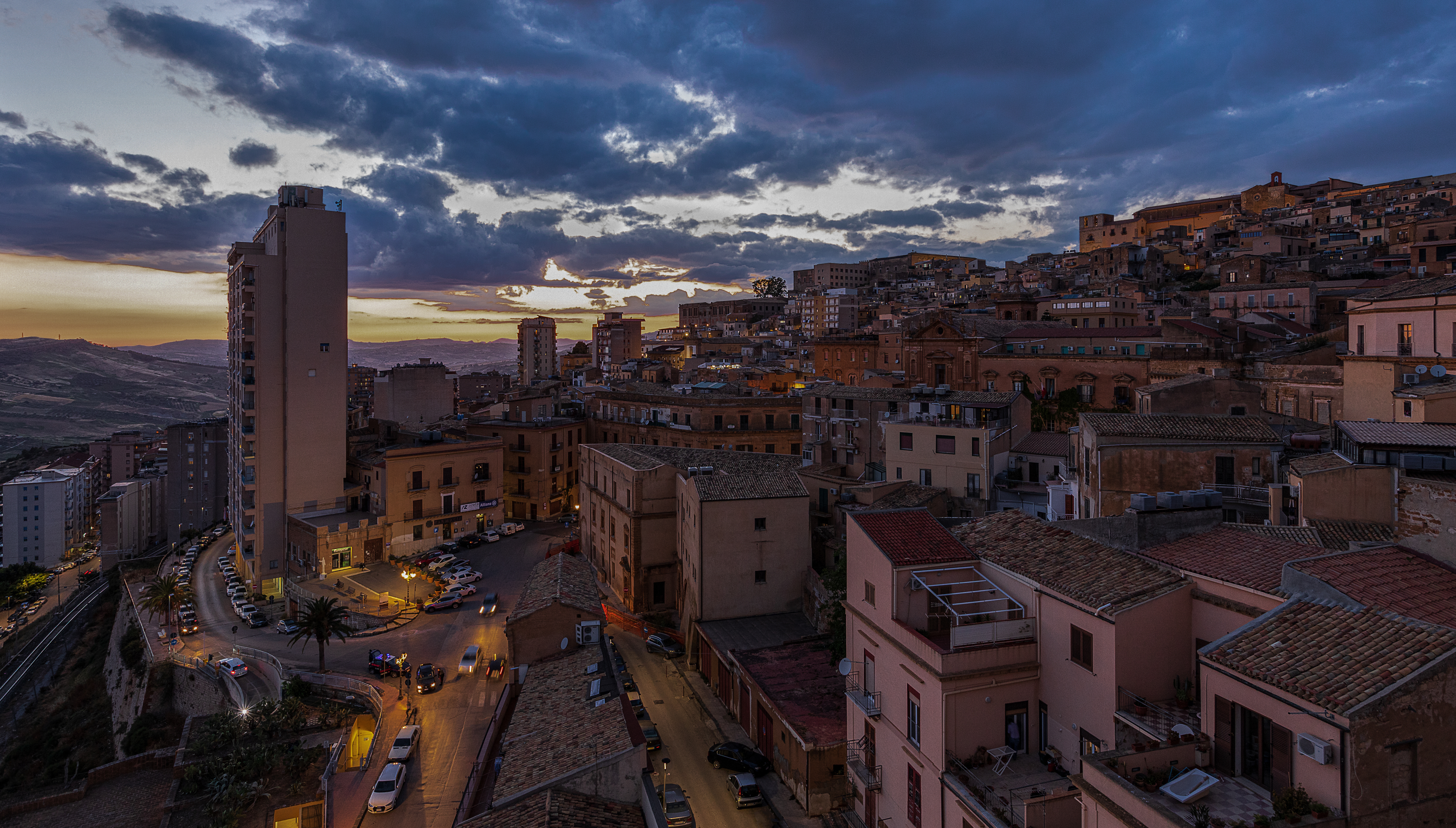
City centre

=== Panoramic views ===
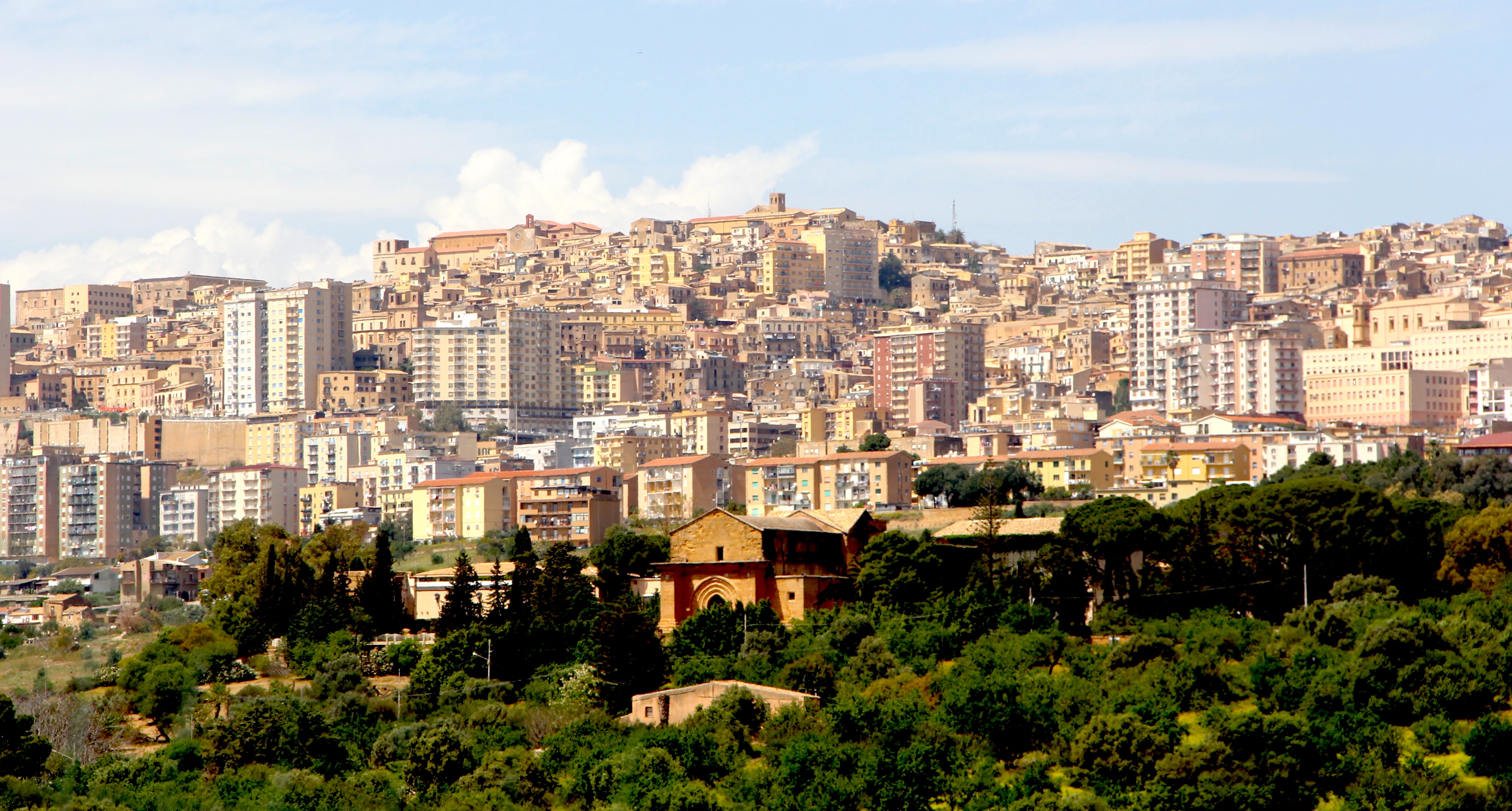

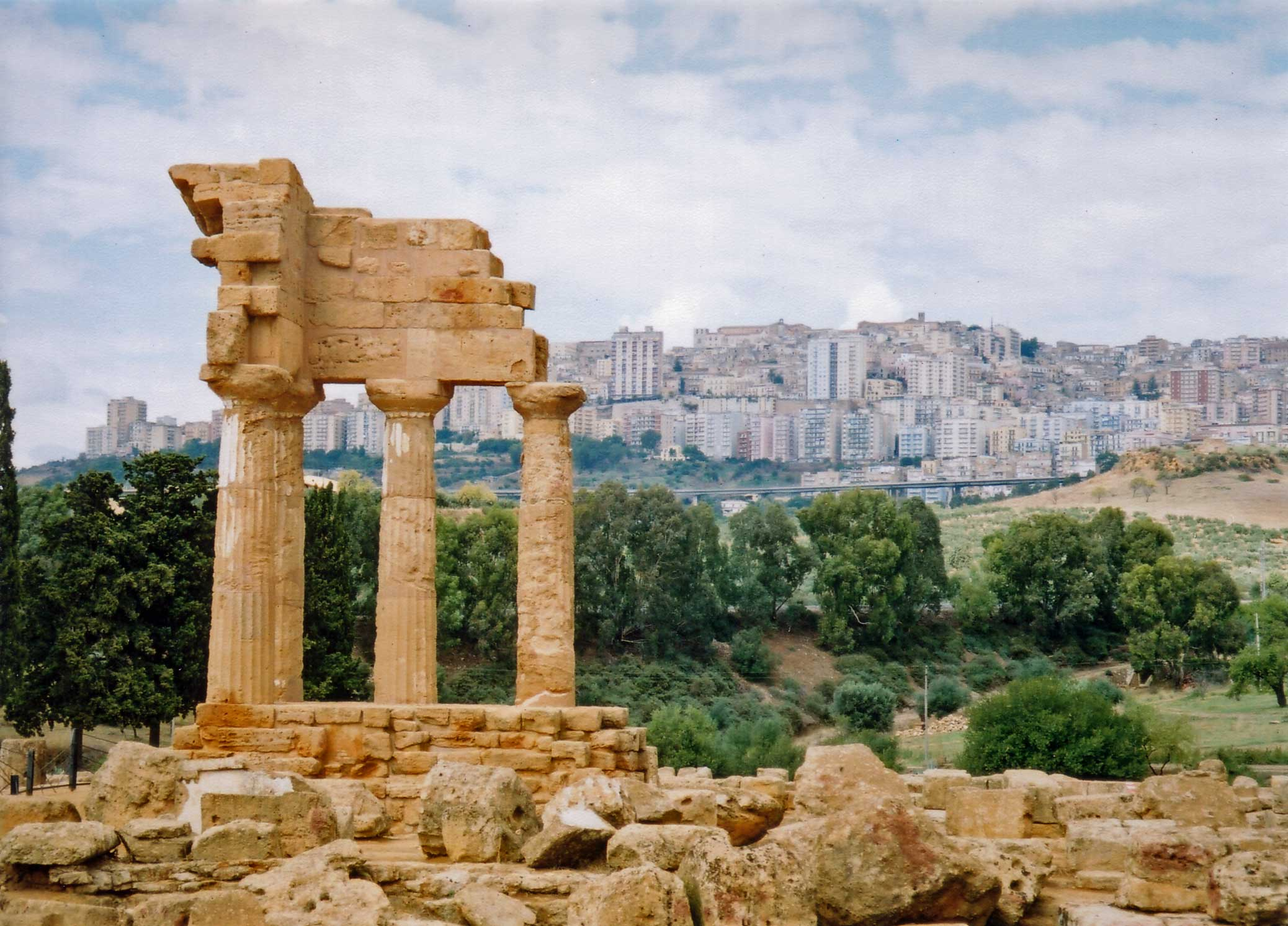

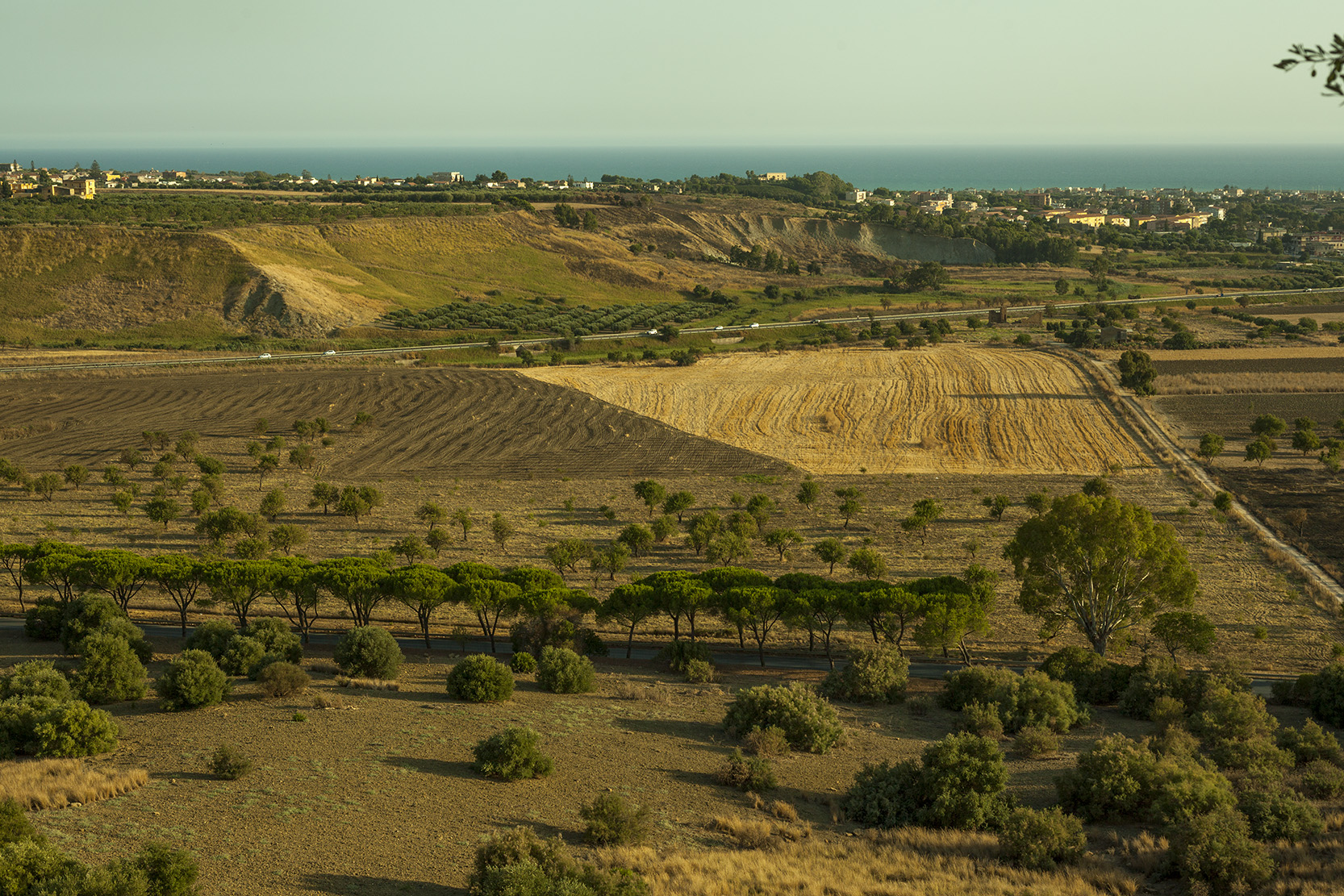

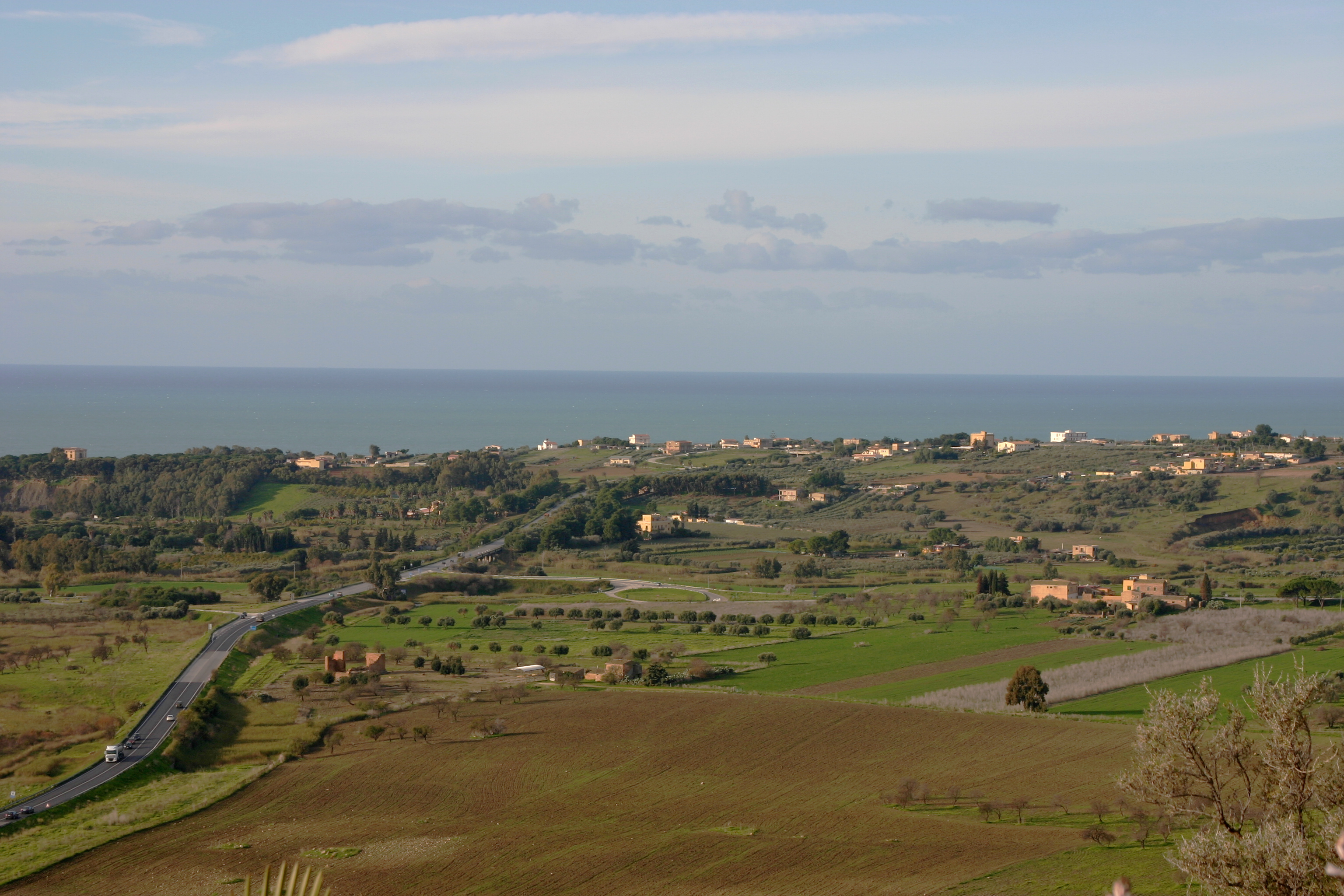

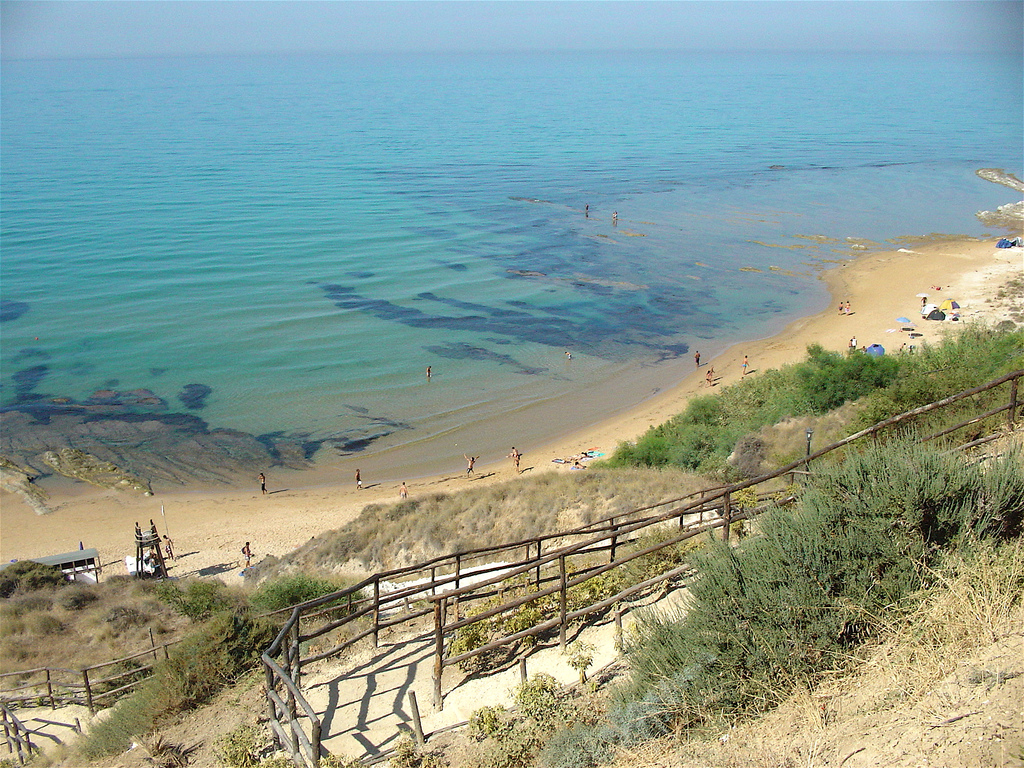

== See also ==
- Siege of Akragas (406 BC)
- Agrigentum inscription
- Battle of Agrigentum (456)
- List of mayors of Agrigento
- Sulfur mining in Sicily

== Sources ==
- Howatson, M. C.; Chilvers, Ian, eds. (1996), "Acragas", The Concise Oxford Companion to Classical Literature, Oxford University Press
- "Agrigento", The Columbia Encyclopædia, Columbia University Press, 2004
- Everett-Heath, John (2005), "Agrigento", Concise Dictionary of World Place-Names, Oxford University Press
- "Agrigento", Encyclopædia Britannica, 2006
- de Angelis, Franco (2016). Archaic and classical Greek Sicily : a social and economic history. New York, NY: Oxford University Press. ISBN 9780195170474.
- de Miro, E. (1962). "La fondazione di Agrigento e l'ellenizzazione del territorio fra il Salso e il Platani". Kokalos. 8: 122–152.
- Richardson, Alexandra (2009). Passionate Patron: The Life of Alexander Hardcastle and the Greek Temples of Agrigento. Oxford: Archaeopress. ISBN 978-1-905739-28-8.
- de Waele, J. A. (1971). Acragas Graeca : die historische Topographie des griechischen Akragas auf Sizilien. 's-Gravenhage: Ministerie van Cultuur, Recreatie en Maatschappelijk Werk. OCLC 258143697.
- Westermark, Ulla (2018). The coinage of Akragas c. 510-406 BC. Uppsala: Uppsala University. ISBN 978-91-513-0269-0.
