= ASD Akragas 2018 =

Italian football club

Akragas
- Full name: Virtus Akragas SLP
- Nicknames: Giganti, Akragantini, Biancoazzurri, Il Gigante
- Founded: 1939; 1952 (re-founded); 2018 (re-founded) 2025 (re-founded)
- Ground: Stadio Esseneto, Agrigento, Italy
- Capacity: 10,000
- President: Salvatore La Porta
- Manager: Fabrizio Cammarata
- League: Eccellenza
Home colours	Away colours

Associazione Sportiva Dilettantistica Akragas 2018, commonly referred to as Akragas, is an Italian association football club based in Agrigento, Sicily. The club, in its first inception, was founded in 1929 and has played many years at Serie C level, and currently plays in Eccellenza.

== History ==
=== The foundation ===
An ancestor of the club was known to have played since at least the early-1930s as Associazione Calcio Agrigento. The club had moderate success in the lower divisions of Italian football; it progressed beyond the regional Sicilian scene to Serie C for the first time in the 1939–40 season.

By the late 1940s A.C. Agrigento had fallen in stature, competing in the regional Promozione Sicily league after being relegated; their decline fully set in 1952 when the club became defunct due to financial difficulties.

=== Revival as Akragas ===
Following the previous club's closure, Akragas was revamped and a new team was set up by chairman Enzo Lauretta during 1952. The club was renamed Unione Sportiva Akragas, rather than using the Italianized version of the name, the club paid homage to the city's Magna Graecia roots. A noted figure in Sicilian football, Carmelo Di Bella was put in place as the club's first manager, while Gaspare Gallo was its first captain. To attract the attention of the supporters of defunct Agrigento, Akragas changed its colour, abandoning its violet and taking the white and blue of Agrigento.

In the 2013–14 season, Akragas barely missed out on promotion to Lega Pro in favour of Savoia, but would go on to achieve this in the next season by winning Group I of the Serie D league. They began to play in the Lega Pro after the 2015–16 season.

Club president Silvio Alessi announced on 13 July 2018, that the team did not register for the upcoming season of Serie D, to which it had been relegated, and the club had been placed in liquidation.

The club was successively refounded and admitted to the Promozione amateur league of Sicily in 2018. In 2023, Akragas won the Eccellenza Sicily (Group A) title and assured promotion to Serie D.

== Colours and badge ==
The team plays in a light blue and white striped kit.

== Honours ==
Serie C2:

- Runner-up (1): 1982–83

Serie D:

- Winners (3): 1980–81; 1991–92; 2014–15
- Runner-up (2): 1958–59; 2013–14

Eccellenza Sicily:

- Winners (1): 2012–13

Promozione Sicily:

- Winners (3): 1956–57; 1977–78

Prima Categoria Sicily:

- Runners-up (1): 1952–53
