= Villaseta =

Coordinates: 37.300°N 13.559°E

Villaseta is a village in Sicily, part of the municipality of Agrigento, with a population of roughly 6,300.

The village was first built during the 17th-century. However, it was extensively redeveloped after a landslide in 1966 to designs by urban planner Marco Ghio.
