= Pál Gábor =

Hungarian film director (1932–1987)

- Born: 2 November 1932; Budapest, Hungary
- Died: 21 October 1987 (aged 55); Rome, Italy
- Occupations: Film director Screenwriter
- Years active: 1962–1987

Pál Gábor (2 November 1932 – 21 October 1987) was a Hungarian film director and screenwriter. He directed 20 films between 1962 and 1987. In 1979, he was a member of the jury at the 29th Berlin International Film Festival.

His most famous work was 1978's Angi Vera, about a woman in a re-education camp in post-war Hungary. His films usually focused on the concerns of people in communist Hungary.

== Selected filmography ==
- Tiltott terület (1968)
- Horizont (1970)
- Utazás Jakabbal (1972)
- A járvány (1975)
- Angi Vera (1978)
- Kettévált mennyezet (1981)
- Hosszú vágta (1983)
- A menyasszony gyönyörű volt (1986)
