= The Bride Was Beautiful =

- Directed by: Pál Gábor
- Written by: Enzo Lauretta; Pál Gábor; Lucio Battistrada
- Produced by: Gianni Minervini
- Starring: Ángela Molina; Massimo Ghini; Marco Leonardi; Stefania Sandrelli
- Cinematography: János Kende
- Edited by: Katalin Kabdebó
- Music by: Nicola Piovani
- Release date: 1986
- Countries: Hungary; Italy

The Bride Was Beautiful (Hungarian: A menyasszony gyönyörű volt, Italian: La sposa era bellissima) is a 1986 Hungarian-Italian romantic drama film directed by Pál Gábor and based on the Enzo Lauretta's novel with the same name.

== Cast ==
- Ángela Molina as Maria
- Massimo Ghini as Sergio
- Stefania Sandrelli as Carmela
- Simona Cavallari as Giovanna
- Marco Leonardi as Giuseppe
- Guia Jelo as Giovanna's mother
