= Sentenced to Death =

1989 film

- Directed by: János Zsombolyai
- Written by: Ferenc Jeli; Ákos Kertész; János Zsombolyai
- Starring: Péter Malcsiner
- Cinematography: Gábor Szabó
- Edited by: Mari Miklós
- Release date: 1989
- Running time: 91 minutes
- Country: Hungary
- Language: Hungarian

Sentenced to Death (Hungarian: A halálraítélt) is a 1989 Hungarian drama film directed by János Zsombolyai. It was entered into the 40th Berlin International Film Festival.

== Cast ==
- Péter Malcsiner as Gergő Ferenc
- Barbara Hegyi as Payer Zsuzsa
- István Bubik as Nagy Béla
- Gábor Máté as Wágner Sándor
- Péter Dóczy
- Gábor Kocsó
- Teri Földi as Gergő édesanyja
- Balázs Tardy
- Miklós Fábián
- Antal Cserna
- Jenő Kiss
- Erzsi Cserhalmi (as Cserhalmi Erzsébet)
- László Czétényi
- Zoltán Vereczkey
