= Castello di Agrigento =

- Agrigento, Sicily, Italy

Site information
- Type: castle
- Owner: Public
- Open to the public: No
- Condition: Ruins

Location
- Coordinates: 37°18′49.7″N 13°34′42.9″E

Site history
- Built: 1087
- Built by: County of Sicily
- Fate: Partially destroyed, 1909

The Castello di Agrigento, also known as the Castrum Agrigenti, is a ruined castle in Agrigento, Sicily. In the Middle Ages, it was one of the most important buildings in the city. It was mostly destroyed in 1909, and today only a few remains of the castle survive.

== History ==
The castle began to be built in 1087, when Count Roger ordered the construction of a fort (castellum firmissimum) in Agrigento, which had just been captured from the Arabs. The castle was constructed on top of a hill which had probably been the city's acropolis in antiquity.

In 1150, the Arab historian Muhammad al-Idrisi described the castle as "one of the main strongholds for the attitude of defence" in one of his writings. It was mentioned in a list of state-owned castles in 1273.

The castle was almost completely destroyed to make way for a municipal reservoir in 1909. Very little remains have survived, and the original layout is not discernible. It is located on public property and is in a state of abandonment.

== Layout ==
The exact layout of the castle is not known. Medieval sources suggest that its walls were protected by fortified towers. A drawing in the Atlante di città e fortezze del Regno di Sicilia - 1640 by Francesco Negro and Carlo Maria Ventimiglia shows that the castle was triangular in shape, and had an inner courtyard.
