= John Everett-Heath =

British writer and diplomat

John Everett-Heath is a British author, former civil servant, and a Fellow of the Royal Geographical Society. Everett-Heath was a military diplomat in Belgrade and, during his 13 years in the civil service, was concerned with Russia, Central Asia, and the Caucasus. He has lived in Cameroun, Cyprus, Italy, Kenya, Malaysia, Oman, United States, and Yemen.

His publications include the Oxford University Press's Concise Dictionary of World Place-Names, and "Place names of the world: historical context, meanings and changes" in which he shares his view that: His opinion is that: place names are a window onto the history and characteristics of a country.
