= Sándor Szoboszlai =

Hungarian actor

- Born: 22 March 1925; Dömös, Hungary
- Died: 4 January 2013 (aged 87); Veszprém, Hungary
- Years active: 1956-2012
- Awards: Jászai Mari Award (1969); Excellent Artist of the People’s Republic of Hungary 1987); Member of Artists’ Order Award (1981); Golden Cross of the Order of Merit of the Republic of Hungary (2012)

Sándor Szoboszlai (22 March 1925 – 4 January 2013) was a Hungarian actor.

== Biography ==
He started his career as an amateur actor. He was a member of the Theatre of Youths and the Petőfi Theatre. He received a degree at the Artist Academy in 1954. He worked for Jókai Theatre of Békéscsaba and Gárdonyi Géza Theatre of Eger between 1956 and 1972.

Later he worked for Vidám Színpad for two and for Petőfi Theatre of Veszprém for 17 years. He was nominated as a representative by Hungarian Democratic Forum during the 1994 parliamentary election. He died in Veszprém.

== Further information ==
- Magyar színházművészeti lexikon, mek.oszk.hu; accessed 25 March 2017.(in Hungarian)
- Profile, Filmkatalógus.hu; accessed 25 March 2017.(in Hungarian)
- Profile, szinhaziadattar.hu; accessed 25 March 2017.(in Hungarian)
