= Gangs Matrix =

British Metropolitan Police database of alleged street gang members

The Gangs Matrix, also known as the Gangs Violence Matrix (GVM), was a database of alleged street gang members created by the Metropolitan Police Service (MPS) in 2012. It was criticised for its use of circumstantial evidence and disproportionate targeting of young black men.

A 2018 investigation by the Information Commissioner's Office found that the use of the Gangs Matrix was in breach of data protection laws, and issued an enforcement notice to bring the operation of the system in line with the law. The enforcement notice was lifted in 2021.

In 2022, the MPS announced that it had removed more than 1000 people, representing over 65% of the entries in the database, on the basis that they referred to people who posed no threat of violence.

In 2022, it was found to be unlawful following a legal challenge by the charity Liberty. The GVM was replaced with "precision policing". Formally, the database stopped being used in February 2024 and was deleted in February 2025.
