= Kenelm Hutchinson Digby =

Kenelm Hutchinson Digby OBE FRCS (4 August 1884 - 23 February 1954) was a British surgeon who lived and worked for many years in Hong Kong, where he held various Professorships at Hong Kong University from 1913 - 1949. The K. H. Digby Memorial Scholarship was established in his honour at the University.

== Life and career ==
Digby was born in Ealing, London, the son of William Digby, who was in the Indian Civil Service. He was the cousin of Kenelm Hubert Digby, the proposer of the notorious 1933 "King and Country" debate in the Oxford Union, and later Attorney General and judge in Sarawak.

Digby was educated at Quernmore School, Bromley, and undertook his medical studies at Guy's Hospital, London, where he was a prize-winning student (holding the Michael Harris, Hilton and Beaney Prizes) and where he gained his MB, BS in 1907 and became a Fellow of the Royal College of Surgeons in 1910. He was House Surgeon and Resident Obstetric Attendant at the hospital. In 1913 he first went to work in Hong Kong. He worked at the University of Hong Kong, holding various Professorships, for many years. In 1939 he was awarded the OBE.

=== Posts held ===
- Surgical Registrar and Anæsthetist to Guy's Hospital, 1909–11
- Principal Medical Officer, Great Central Railway, 1912
- Professor of Anatomy, University of Hong Kong, 1913–23
- Professor of Surgery, University of Hong Kong, 1923–45
- Ho Tung Professor of Clinical Surgery, University of Hong Kong, 1915–45
- Honorary Consultant in Surgery to Government of Hong Kong, 1915–48
- Surgeon, Queen Mary Hospital, 1930–48
- engaged in research work, at Royal College of Surgeons of England, 1949 onwards
- Emeritus Professor of Surgery, University of Hong Kong, 1950

Digby was interned in Stanley internment camp, Hong Kong during the war. He retired from Hong Kong to England in 1949.

Digby married Selina Dorothy Law in 1913, and the couple had two daughters.

In 1955, the year after his death, the K. H. Digby Memorial Fund was set up at the University of Hong Kong.

Professor Digby will be remembered for his excellent teaching, his enthusiasm in the wards, his infectious laugh and humour, and his stern discipline in the operation theatre. He was a big man in every sense of the word.

== Publications ==
- 1919 Immunity in Health: The Functions of the Tonsils and the Appendix 1919
  - plus many papers in medical journals
