= Richard Thomas (solicitor) =

Information Commissioner of the United Kingdom (born 1949)

- Born: 18 June 1949 (age 76)
- Term: As UK Information Commissioner 2 December 2002 – 28 June 2009
- Predecessor: Elizabeth France
- Successor: Christopher Graham
- Spouse: Julia Clarke (m. 1974)
- Children: 3

Richard James Thomas CBE (born 18 June 1949) is known for his tenure as Information Commissioner of the United Kingdom, a post which he held from December 2002 to June 2009. During his time in office, he raised concerns over the increased use of closed-circuit television (CCTV) and the introduction of ID Cards in the UK.

Thomas is currently Deputy chairman and co-opted Council Member of the Consumers' Association, Trustee / Director of Whitehall & Industry Group and was Chairman of the Administrative Justice and Tribunals Council from 1 September 2009 until its abolition in August 2013. He is also a visiting professor of Law at Northumbria University.

Born in June 1949, the son of a magistrate, Thomas attended public school and studied law at Southampton University in the late 1960s (he was later awarded an honorary Doctor of Laws from this same university).

In his early career, he worked as an articled clerk and solicitor with Freshfields Bruckhaus Deringer (from 1971) and the Citizens Advice Bureau, Notting Hill (from 1974). He then went on to work in legal and public affairs positions with the National Consumer Council (from 1979) and the Office of Fair Trading. While at the National Consumer Council he was also involved with the Campaign for Freedom of Information and had a secondary involvement in the publishing of a book of essays entitled Consuming Secrets.

The measures in the bill go well beyond establishing a secure, reliable and trustworthy ID card. The measures in relation to the National Identity Register and data trail of identity checks on individuals risk an unnecessary and disproportionate intrusion into individuals' privacy.

— Richard Thomas, On the National Identity Register

Before appointment as Information Commissioner, he was the first Director of Public Policy at Clifford Chance.

He has been married to Julia Clarke since 1974 and they have three adult children. He and his wife live in Reigate, Surrey.

Thomas was appointed Commander of the Order of the British Empire (CBE) in the 2009 Birthday Honours "for public service".

== Leveson enquiry ==
A document submitted to the Leveson Inquiry by witness Alec Owens indicates that Richard Thomas refused to prosecute perpetrators of phone hacking, despite receiving a recommendation that "all parties identified as being involved be jointly prosecuted for 'conspiracy to breach the Data Protection Act 1998'."

Government offices
Preceded by Elizabeth France	United Kingdom Information Commissioner; 2002–2009	Succeeded by Christopher Graham
