= Sindh Assembly Building =

Provincial Assembly House of Sindh

- عمارت اسمبلی سندھ
- Former names: National Assembly House (1947–1959)

General information
- Status: Semi-functional
- Type: Heritage
- Architectural style: Art Deco
- Location: Court Road, Saddar Town, South Karachi District, Karachi Division, Sindh, Karachi, Pakistan
- Coordinates: 24.854426°N 67.0202927°E
- Groundbreaking: 1940 by Sir Lancelot Graham
- Construction started: 11 March 1940
- Opened: 4 March 1943 by Sir Hugh Dow
- Owner: Government of Sindh

Technical details
- Floor count: 2

Design and construction
- Architects: Anderson & Asarpota

Other information
- Seating capacity: 62

The Sindh Assembly Building is a historic building located on Court Road in Karachi that serves as the camp office of chief minister of Sindh, deputy speaker, opposition leader, secretariat speaker, along with offices for the members of the secretariat, and the law department. It was the seat of Provincial Assembly of Sindh until 2014, the Constituent Assembly of Pakistan between 1947 and 1956 and the National Assembly of Pakistan between 1956 and 1958. The building was designed by architects Anderson & Asarpota and was constructed between 1940 and 1943. It was opened on 4 March 1943 as the seat of the Sind Legislative Assembly. Following the independence of Pakistan, it was taken over by the Constituent Assembly of Pakistan.

== History ==
The building's construction was started on 11 March 1940, when, Sind's governor Sir Lancelot Graham, laid its foundation stone. It took nearly three years to complete and it functioned as the seat of the Sind Legislative Assembly till 1947. It was designed by Anderson & Asarpota in Art Deco style. On 3 March 1943, one day before the building's inauguration, Pakistan Resolution was presented at the assembly building. After the independence of Pakistan in 1947, it became the place where Muhammad Ali Jinnah was sworn as the governor-general of Pakistan. In the post-independence Pakistan, it was made the seat of the Constituent Assembly of Pakistan and another assembly hall was built inside the campus of NJV Government Higher Secondary School for the Provincial Assembly of Sindh in 1949 at Muhammad Ali Jinnah Road of the city. After 1956, it was functioned as the seat of the National Assembly of Pakistan till 1959. On 31 August 2007, foundation stone for new assembly hall was laid in the building's backyard. Construction for the new hall was started in 2011 and the provincial assembly's session activities were shifted there in 2014. The government planned to convert the old building into a museum.
