= Elizabeth Denham =

Elizabeth Denham CBE, LL.D.
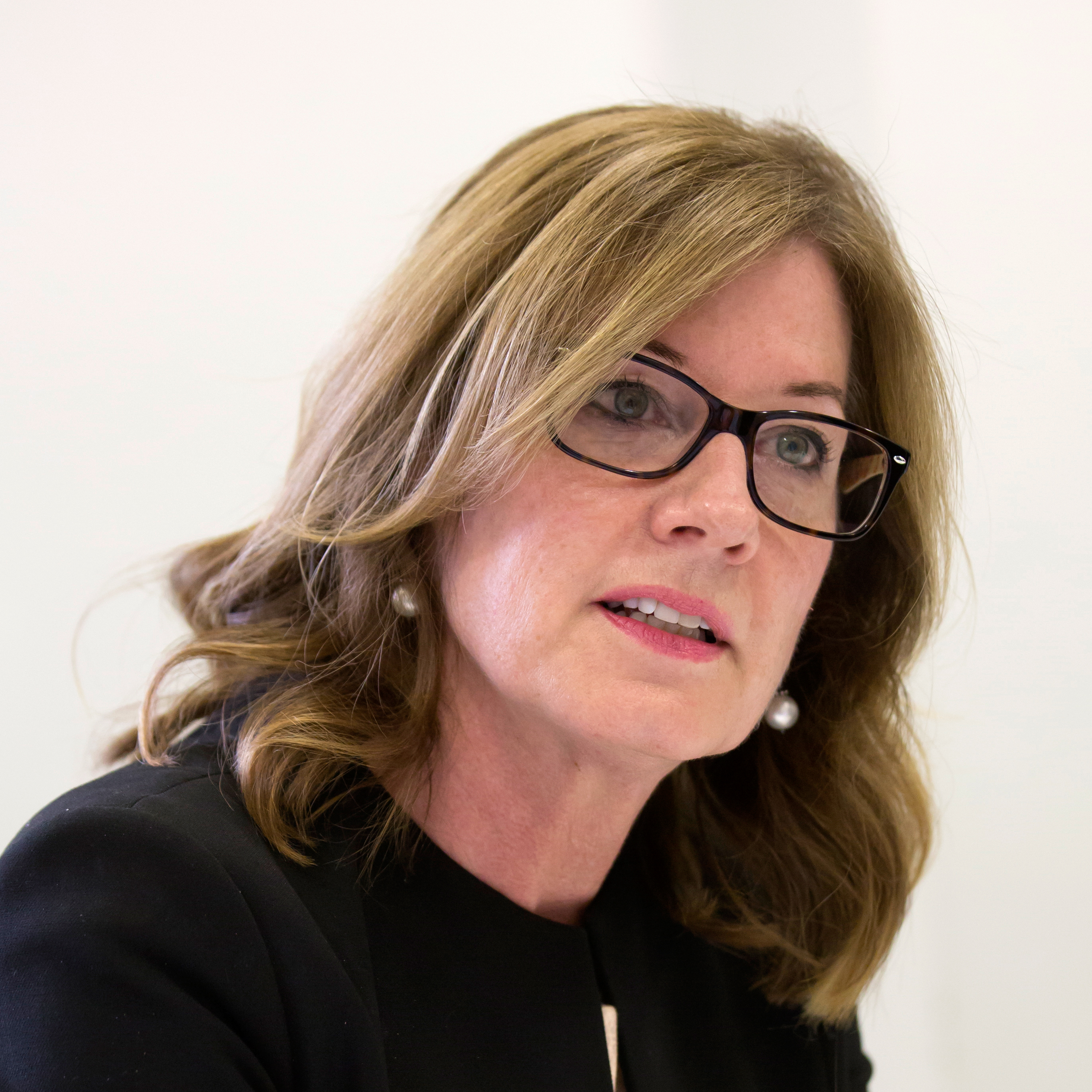
- Elizabeth Denham

Fifth Information Commissioner
- In office 18 July 2016 – 30 November 2021
- Preceded by: Christopher Graham
- Succeeded by: John Edwards

Chair of the Jersey Data Protection Authority
- In office 28 October 2024 – present

Personal details
- Education: University of British Columbia

Elizabeth Denham CBE, LL. D. (hon.) is the Chair of the Jersey Data Protection Authority. Denham was previously the UK Information Commissioner at the Information Commissioner's Office in Cheshire from July 2016, taking over the role from Christopher Graham, until November 2021. Denham previously held the title of Information and Privacy Commissioner for British Columbia, having been appointed to that role in May 2010. Prior to this she had been the Assistant Privacy Commissioner of Canada from 2007.

Denham is a trustee at 5Rights Foundation, an organisation founded by Baroness Beeban Kidron to promote the rights of children online.

== Early life and education ==
Denham studied at the University of British Columbia from 1977 to 1984 and holds a bachelor's degree in history and a master's degree in archival studies from the university's iSchool (Library, Archival and Information Studies).

== Career ==
During her time as Information and Privacy Commissioner for British Columbia, Denham called for the proactive disclosure of records and published best practices for government ministries and public bodies. She also co-authored a guidance document called Getting Accountability Right with a Privacy Management Program.

Denham was appointed UK Information Commissioner in July 2016. She and her office deal with the Data Protection Act 2018 and the General Data Protection Regulation, the Privacy and Electronic Communications (EC Directive) Regulations 2003 across the UK; and the Freedom of Information Act 2000 and the Environmental Information Regulations 2004 in England, Wales and Northern Ireland and, to a limited extent, in Scotland.

At the Information Commissioner's Office, she welcomed the introduction of the data protection laws that came into effect in May 2018, and focused on the role data protection must play in innovation, and the importance of organisations understanding the growing onus on companies to be accountable for what they do with personal data. She also called for the Freedom of Information Act to be extended to private bodies doing work on behalf of the public, and proposed a review of legislation around the duty to document information.

Denham has undertaken investigations into Equifax, WhatsApp, TalkTalk, Uber and Facebook, and oversaw the conclusion of the investigation of the Information Commissioner's Office into charities' fundraising activities. She issued a series of fines for companies behind nuisance marketing, and in December 2018 she welcomed the new law that enabled the Information Commissioner's Office to hold company bosses directly responsible and to fine them personally for breaches of the Privacy and Electronic Communications Regulations.

In May 2017, Denham decided to look into potential unlawful marketing involving repurposing of data during the 2016 United Kingdom European Union membership referendum. When Denham produced her final report in November 2020, she announced that she had "found no further evidence to change [her] earlier view that SCL Group and Cambridge Analytica were not involved in the EU referendum campaign in the UK." She also said she found no evidence of Russian involvement in the referendum.

She launched the inaugural Data Protection Practitioner Award for Excellence in Data Protection at the 11th annual Information Commissioner's Office conference.

In January 2022, Denham started working at the London offices of global law firm Baker McKenzie in a move criticised as "extraordinary" in light of the firm having defended Facebook against regulatory action by the Information Commissioner's Office while Denham was in office, and the short timeframe between leaving office and the announcement being made by the firm.

She currently serves as a Trustee for the advisory board of the 5Rights Foundation (a charity committed to children's health and safety) and an advisory board member for Oxford University's Internet Institute.

Denham has also authored or co-authored a spate of opinions and articles in 2022: including the essay “Citizens first” for the academic journal Information Polity; a call for increasing collaboration among Canada's digital regulators, posted to the C. D. Howe Institute's website; and an opinion in Canada's Globe and Mail newspaper that argued for coordinated, global efforts to create harmonized, comprehensive legal protections for children's online safety.

== Awards and offices ==
In 2011, Denham received the distinguished alumna award from UBC iSchool (Library, Archival and Information Studies) for her work in archives and the field of access and privacy.

In 2013, she received the Queen Elizabeth II Diamond Jubilee Medal for her service as an officer of the legislature of British Columbia, Canada.

In 2016, Denham was awarded the Grace-Pépin Access to Information Award for having been "a staunch advocate for access to information rights."

In 2018, she was placed first in the DataIQ 100 Top 10.

She was appointed Commander of the Order of the British Empire (CBE) in the 2019 New Years Honours for services to protecting information.

In 2020 she was announced as the winner of BCS, The Chartered Institute for IT's Society Medal as a result of her office's investigation into unlawful data collection practices by political campaigns.

Denham served as Chair of the International Conference of Data Protection and Privacy Commissioners, later the Global Privacy Assembly, from 2018 until 2021.

The International Association of Privacy Professionals named Denham the recipient of its 2022 Privacy Leadership Award.

The Global Privacy Assembly named Denham its second winner of the annual Giovani Butterelli Award in 2022, an honour named for the iconic European Data Protection Supervisor.

Denham received an honorary doctorate of laws in 2022 from the University of Victoria, in British Columbia, for recognition of her international contributions to privacy and access over decades.

Government offices
Preceded by Christopher Graham	UK Information Commissioner; 2016–2021	Succeeded by John Edwards
