= Udhaw Das Tarachand =

Rao Bahadur Udhaw Das Tarachand (1870 – January 17, 1943) was an Sindhi British Indian businessman and philanthropist from Shikarpur, Sindh. He is known for establishing Rao Bahadur Udhaw Das Tara Chand Hospital in Shikarpur.

== Life ==
Udhaw Das was born in Shikarpur District in 1870. A sugar trader by profession, he became a well-known philanthropist in the later part of his life.

Due to the absence of medical facilities in Shikarpur, his mother died. He began making efforts to construct a hospital in the city in order to prevent this from happening again. In the start of the 20th century, he partnered with Shikapur Municipal Committee and provided with funds of Rs.100,000 to build a hospital from scratch. The hospital's construction began in 1933, and Lancelot Graham, the governor of Sindh, officially opened it in 1937. Even after the hospital's official opening, Udhaw Das continued to work for it, and later went to Bombay to collect donations for the hospital, but became gravely ill. He died on January 17, 1943, at Sir Hari Kishan Hospital. His family emigrated to India after partition.

A statue was erected in his honor at the hospital he founded, but due to communal violence it was shifted to the University of Sindh.
