= Smith v Lloyds TSB Bank plc =

- Court: High Court
- Full case name: Terence William Smith v Lloyds TSB Bank plc
- Decided: 23 February 2005

Court membership
- Judge sitting: Laddie J

Keywords
- data protection

Smith v Lloyds TSB Bank plc [2005] EWHC 246 was a judicial decision of the English High Court relating to the Data Protection Act 1998.

The claimant was seeking data from the bank, and he sought to advance two relatively novel lines of argument. The first was referred to in the case as the "once processed always processed" argument, i.e. that even if the respondent no longer held the data in electronic form, if they once held it in electronic form they are obligated to provide it. The second was that if data was held in a non-electronic form but could readily be turned into electronic form, then it constituted data for the purposes of the act. Both arguments failed.

== Facts ==
The claimant, Mr Smith, was the former managing director and controlling shareholder of a company called Display Electronics Ltd (referred to in the judgment as "DEL"). At some time in 1988, Mr Smith decided to transfer the banking for DEL from Barclays Bank Plc to Lloyds Bank. At that time DEL owed Barclays over £250,000. An agreement was entered into between Mr Smith, DEL and Lloyds under which Lloyds would take over the funding of the development, but one of the terms of this agreement was that both Mr Smith's personal borrowings (which at that time were very small) and DEL's borrowings would be subject to a security interest over the development in favour of the bank, and also by a mortgage on Mr Smith's home. DEL did not prosper, and eventually Lloyds called in its loans. As a result, DEL went into liquidation, and Mr Smith lost his home. The bank also lodged a bankruptcy petition with respect to Mr Smith personally. A number of litigation cases ensued between Mr Smith and Lloyds. One of the assertions Mr Smith made in these cases was that he and Lloyds had entered into an oral agreement to the effect that Lloyds would make available to DEL long term finance in a substantial amount. Lloyds always denied the existence of any such oral agreement. In at least two of the actions findings of fact had been made to the effect that no such oral agreement existed. But Mr Smith believed that certain documentation held by Lloyds will prove his contentions.

In the various prior proceedings between Mr Smith and the bank there had been only very limited disclosure by Lloyds. Accordingly, Mr Smith felt that the crucial documents evidencing the oral agreement have been withheld from the courts. The purpose of his application was to secure access to them pursuant to the provisions of the Data Protection Act 1998. Specifically he sought a declaration that certain Notes and Memoranda recorded by Lloyds, whether filed under his own name or that of DEL, are Mr Smith's personal data in a relevant filing system, as defined in the 1998 Act, and an order that Lloyds provide copies to Mr Smith of certain documents.

== Judgment ==
Laddie J commenced his judgment by noting that Mr Smith's case appeared to run contrary to the two leading decisions in this area of the law: the judgment of the Court of Appeal in Durant v Financial Services Authority [2003] EWCA Civ 1746 and a former decision of Laddie J himself in Johnson v Medical Defence Union [2004] EWHC 347 (Ch).

Mr Smith sought to advance broadly two arguments:

1. whether "data" in section 1(1) of the Data Protection Act should be construed so as to include information which was once, but is no longer, held on computer; and
2. whether "data" in section 1(1) should to be construed to include information in documents which could rapidly be turned into a digital format.

The bank resisted those arguments, and raised two counter-arguments:

1. whether the information sought was "personal data" with respect to Mr Smith; and
2. whether it was an abuse of process to seek information to try and reopen litigation which had previously been contested and lost by Mr Smith.

Laddie J noted that the first point had been previously decided by Johnson, an authority which was binding upon him, and so he was bound to rule against it. Counsel for the claimants accepted this, but noted that he was bound to make that claim in case he wanted to challenge the correctness of Johnson in the Court of Appeal.

He also rejected the argument relating to physical documents which were convertible into electronic form. Counsel for Mr Smith had argued "that any selection of paper documents is scannable" and therefore should be treated as "data". The Court was unable to accept the width of that submission, as that would mean that every document in the world would be treated as electronic data under the legislation. It was also felt that this construction (apart from being enormously wide) was inconsistent with Recital (27) of Directive 95/46/EC upon which the Act was based, which stated "nonetheless, as regards manual processing, this Directive covers only filing systems, not unstructured files".

Having ruled accordingly, Laddie J acknowledged that "it is not strictly necessary to deal with [the] argument ... that, if the documents here contained data within the meaning of the 1998 Act, it is not personal data." However, because he felt that it was a short point and could be dealt with simply, he did so anyway. He noted that the statutory definition of "personal data" was considered in Durant. Applying the principles of that case, he held that it was clear that the documents held by Lloyds and the information contained within them are not personal to Mr Smith in the relevant sense - the files that do exist all relate to the loans to DEL, and not Mr Smith personally.

In the final paragraph of the judgment the court also added that it was not necessary to consider the bank's additional alternative argument that this was not a case where the court's discretion should be exercised in Mr Smith's favour because he intends to use any material obtained from Lloyds for the purpose of re-opening the arguments which he has advanced and lost in at least two earlier sets of proceedings, and that would be an abuse of process.
