= Christopher Graham =

- Born: Christopher Sidney Matthew Graham; 21 September 1950 (age 75)
- Employer: Parliament of the United Kingdom
- Spouse: Mary Crockett (m. 2010)

Christopher Sidney Matthew Graham (born 21 September 1950) took over the role of UK Information Commissioner from Richard Thomas on 29 June 2009 and concluded his tenure on 28 June 2016. Prior to this appointment, Graham was Director General of the United Kingdom's Advertising Standards Authority.

Christopher Graham's father, David Maurice Graham (1911–99), served as a broadcaster with the BBC External Services from 1939 to 1971. He reported on the liberation of the Nazi death camps and Indian independence, and subsequently specialised in covering Eastern Europe. As an undergraduate, he had played a leading role in The King and Country debate of 1933 at the Oxford Union. David Graham's father, Sir Lancelot Graham (1880-1958), was the first Governor of Sind in British India (now Pakistan).

Christopher Graham was a boy chorister at Canterbury Cathedral. He went on to St Edward's School, Oxford, then Liverpool University, where he took a BA in History, serving as President of the Guild of Undergraduates (1971–72). He was a Liverpool City Councillor from 1971 to 1974, being one of the youngest people ever elected to a local council in the UK. He was elected as a Liberal and served as a councillor for St. Michael's ward. Prior to his appointment as Director General of the ASA in 2000, Graham had worked for the BBC since the mid-1970s, including serving as Secretary to the Board of Governors. In the general elections of 1983 and 1987 he stood unsuccessfully as the Liberal-SDP Alliance candidate for the North Wiltshire parliamentary constituency. On both occasions, he came second to the Conservative candidate.

Graham married Mary Crockett, a journalist with The Scotsman, in April 2010.

== Notes ==
Government offices
Preceded by Richard Thomas	United Kingdom Information Commissioner; 2009 - 2016	Succeeded by Elizabeth Denham
