= David Maurice Graham =

British broadcaster

- Born: 16 August 1911; Bombay, British India
- Died: 12 August 1999 (aged 87)
- Occupations: Broadcaster, commentator
- Employer: BBC
- Known for: Oxford Union “King and Country” debate (1933)
- Spouse: Rosemary Harris (m. 1943–1988)
- Children: 3

David Maurice Graham (16 August 1911 – 12 August 1999) was a British broadcaster and BBC executive. As an undergraduate at the University of Oxford in 1933, he gained prominence for his role in the famous “King and Country” debate.

== Early life ==
Graham was born in Bombay (now Mumbai), the son of Sir Lancelot Graham (1880–1958), a senior civil servant who became the first Governor of Sind Province. He was educated at Rugby School and went on to Balliol College, Oxford, where he studied Greats and became an active member of the Oxford Union Society. Before the Second World War, he also spent time in Germany, becoming fluent in the language.

== The "King and Country" debate ==
In 1933, while serving as the Union’s librarian and secretary, Graham drafted and seconded a motion introduced by fellow undergraduate Kenelm Hubert Digby stating that "this House will in no circumstances fight for its King and Country". The motion, carried by 275 votes to 173, was interpreted by some as a sign of pacifism and national decline amid the rise of Adolf Hitler in Germany. The British press reacted strongly, with newspapers such as The Daily Express, The Daily Telegraph, and The Times denouncing the resolution and its supporters.

The debate’s records were torn from the Union’s minute book by protesting students, but Graham later restored them from memory. Although critics linked the motion to appeasement, later historians and journalists noted that there was no evidence Hitler was influenced by it, and that many who voted in favor later served in the armed forces during the war.

== BBC career ==
After briefly working as a schoolteacher, Graham joined the BBC as a talks producer. During the Second World War, he broadcast in German under the pseudonym Robert Graham. He later reported from Germany and India, and his linguistic expertise extended to several European and Asian languages. In the Cold War period, he served as an executive in the BBC’s Russian-language and East European services, eventually heading the Central Research Unit before his retirement in 1971.

== Later life and death ==
Graham retired from the BBC in 1971 and was active as a lay reader in the Church of England and supporter of the Liberal Party. He married Rosemary Harris in 1943, she died in 1988. David Graham died on 12 August 1999 just shy of his 88th birthday. He was survived by a daughter and two sons, including UK Information Commissioner Christopher Graham.
