= Pakistan Resolution in Sindh assembly =

Pakistan Resolution

Provincial Assembly of Sindh
- Long title: Proceedings of the Sind legislative assembly for a Muslim state
- Territorial extent: Sind province: Khairpur State (De-facto)
- Enacted: October 1938 (First proceeding); March 1940 (Second proceeding)

Summary
- This resolution passed by Sind assembly endorsed Pakistan movement and supported Sindh's accession to a future Muslim state.
- Status: Amended

The Sindh assembly was the first British Indian legislature to pass the resolution in favour of Pakistan. Influential Sindhi activists under the supervision of G.M. Syed and other important leaders at the forefront of the provincial autonomy movement joined the Muslim League in 1938 and presented the Pakistan resolution in the Sindh Assembly in 1943. In 1890 Sindh acquired representation for the first time in the Bombay Legislative Assembly. Four members represented Sindh. Those leaders and many others from Sindh played an important role in ensuring the separation of Sindh from the Bombay Presidency, which took place on 1 April 1936.

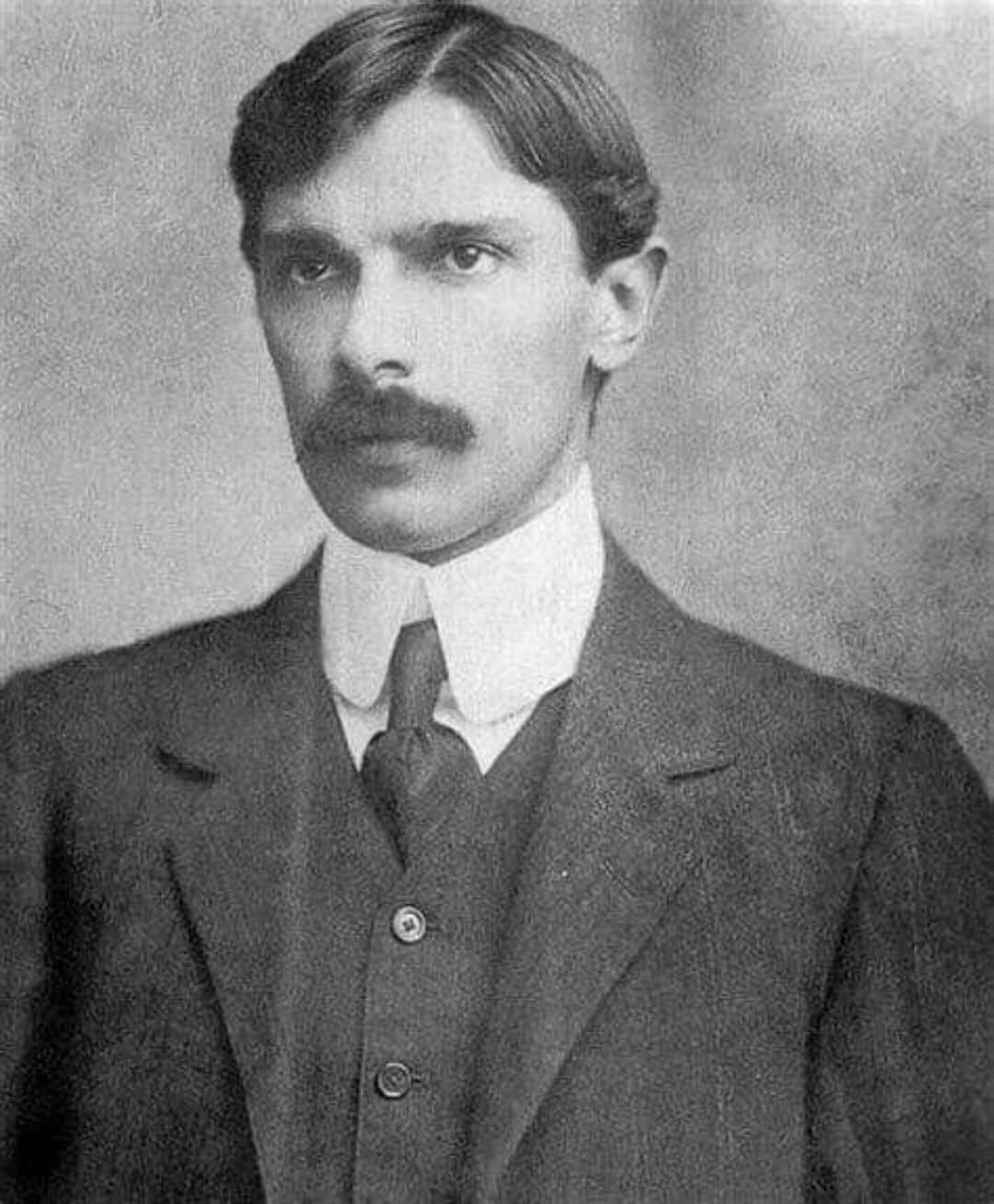
Muhammad Ali Jinnah, a lead proponent for the support for Pakistan.

The newly created province of Sindh secured a legislative assembly of its own, elected on the basis of communal and minorities' representation. Sir Lancelot Graham was appointed as the first governor of Sindh by the British government on 1 April 1936. He was also the Head of the council, which comprised 25 members, including two advisors from the Bombay Council to administer the affairs of Sindh until 1937. The British ruled the area for a century. According to English explorer Richard Burton, Sindh was one of the most restive provinces during the British Raj and was, at least originally, home to many prominent Muslim leaders such as Ubaidullah Sindhi and Muhammad Ali Jinnah who strove for greater Muslim autonomy. At the 27th Session of the Muslim League at Lahore on March 23, 1940, Sir Haji Abdullah Haroon was among those who spoke and endorsed the Pakistan Resolution.
