= Kenelm Hubert Digby =

British judge

Kenelm Hubert Digby MBE (10 March 1912, in London – 5 August 2001) was the proposer of the controversial 1933 "King and Country" debate in the Oxford Union who later became the Attorney General and a judge in Sarawak.

== Biography ==
Digby was born in London, the son of Edward Aylmer Digby by marriage to Winifred Digby Watson, his first cousin. Digby's paternal grandfather was Sir Kenelm Edward Digby, a lawyer who was Permanent Under-Secretary in the British Home Office from 1895 to 1903; his father was also a lawyer, who had commanded a warship in the Great War and had stood unsuccessfully for parliament as both a Liberal and a Labour candidate.

Digby was educated at Lydgate House Preparatory School and then Gresham's School, in Norfolk before he read philosophy, politics and economics (PPE) at St John's College, Oxford.

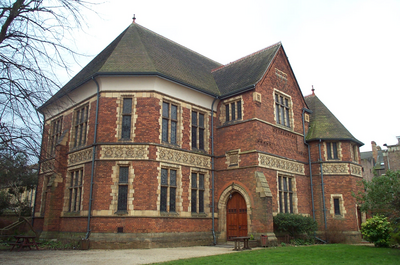
The Oxford Union's debating chamber

In 1933, at a debate in the Oxford Union, Digby proposed the motion "That this House would in no circumstances fight for its King and country". The motion was originally drafted by fellow undergraduate David Graham. The debate was lively, and the motion was eventually carried by 275 votes to 153. A nationwide furore followed, and Digby and his fellow undergraduates were accused of sending the dangerous message to Europe's dictators that the British were soft and would not fight. Isis, a student magazine of the University of Oxford, reported that Digby had a "tub-thumping style of oratory which would be more appreciated in Hyde Park than in the Union". Sixty years after the event, Digby mused, "It was just a debate. I don't know what all the fuss was about. Frank Hardie had asked me to propose the motion and I agreed. That's all there was to it. But ever since the debate security intelligence organisations seem to have taken an interest in me". Digby kept the white feathers that he was given after the debate.

In 1934, he was called to the Bar and, a few days later, sailed to Kuching in Sarawak as a newly-recruited District Officer to work for Rajah Charles Vyner Brooke, last of the White Rajahs of Sarawak. He returned to England at the end of his contract in 1939 and went into chambers as a pupil of Neil Lawson, who subsequently became a High Court Judge. On the outbreak of the Second World War, he joined the National Council for Civil Liberties as an unpaid volunteer while he was awaiting his call-up, having no intention of registering as a conscientious objector. In the spring of 1940, he was asked to return to Sarawak, where he was appointed as Legal Adviser to Rajah Charles Brooke and as a member of the Rajah's Council. He played an important role in drafting Sarawak's 1941 constitution. With the Japanese invasion of Borneo, Sarawak was occupied by the Japanese in December 1941, and the Europeans were interned, first in houses and prisons in Kuching and then at the Batu Lintang camp, outside Kuching. Digby spent three-and a-half-years there until he was liberated in September 1945.

In 1940, Digby met Mutal Fielding on a P&O liner on the way back to Kuching, and they became engaged in Singapore in 1941. Mutal lived in Hong Kong, and before they could be married, the war intervened. Mutal was interned at Stanley Internment Camp, and among the many other internees was Kenelm's cousin Professor Kenelm Hutchinson Digby, who was the head of surgery at Hong Kong University. Digby and Mutal were finally reunited in November 1945 in Southampton, when Digby arrived home on HMS Ranchi. The Digbys were married on 21 February 1946 at Sherfield English, near Romsey, Hampshire, before he returned to Sarawak. Digby rejoined the Sarawak Civil Service as Legal Adviser, rising to become Attorney-General and editor of the Sarawak Gazette and a circuit judge.

Digby's appointment as a circuit judge ended in 1951, and he returned to London and practised briefly at the bar. He also found alternative work as a deputy coroner to five London boroughs. In 1955, he and his wife migrated to New Zealand, tempted by the dominion's assisted migration scheme. He worked as a solicitor for the State Advances Corporation in Wellington for five years and was appointed solicitor to the Department of Health. He retired in 1977, and in the 1978 New Year Honours, he was appointed a Member of the Order of the British Empire. He was also a Companion of the Star of Sarawak. He died on 5 August 2001 after a fall in his garden and was survived by Mutal and their three children.

For Digby, the fallout from the Oxford debate of 1933 lasted many decades. A lifelong socialist but never a communist, Digby's suspected communism made him unpopular with the authorities in Sarawak and brought his career there to a premature end, and he was rarely briefed by solicitors when he worked as a barrister in England. In 1980, he published a memoir, Lawyer in the Wilderness. After his death, his widow commented, "That Oxford Union motion haunted him. It dogged him wherever he went".

== Selected bibliography ==
- Lawyer in the Wilderness Ithaca, New York: Cornell University, 1980 (Data Paper 114, Southeast Asia Program, Department of Asian Studies). Large portions are reproduced verbatim in Barbed Wire Between Us.
