= Elizabeth France =

British civil servant

Elizabeth Irene France CBE (née Leicester; born 1 February 1950) is the former chair of the Office for Legal Complaints. She was appointed in February 2009 and was chair until 2014 when Steve Green became the Chair. From 1994 to 2002 she was the Data Protection Registrar / Information Commissioner and from 2002 to 2009 Chief Ombudsman and Chief Executive of Ombudsman Services Ltd.

Elizabeth France is chair of the UK Public Affairs Council, a member of the British Transport Police Authority, vice president of Aberystwyth University and a member of the General Assembly of Manchester University.

Elizabeth France is also chair of the Security Industry Authority, a role she took up in January 2014.

== Career ==
Elizabeth read politics at Aberystwyth (1968- 1971). Prior to her appointment (1994) as Data Protection Registrar, she worked in the Home Office. She was awarded CBE in 2002 for services to data protection. She holds honorary doctorate degrees.

Government offices
Preceded by Eric Howe	UK Information Commissioner (Data Protection Registrar); 1994 - 2002	Succeeded by Richard Thomas
