= Eric Howe =

British former business executive (born 1931)

Eric Howe CBE
- Born: 4 October 1931 (age 95)
- Education: Liverpool University
- Term: As UK Data Protection Registrar September 1984 – 1994
- Successor: Elizabeth France
- Spouse: Patricia Schollick (m. 1968)
- Children: 2

Eric James Howe CBE (born 4 October 1931) is a British former business executive who in September 1984 became his country's first Data Protection Registrar.

== Biography ==
=== Provenance and early years ===
Eric Howe was born at Stretford in the registration area of Barton-upon-Irwell, on the western edge of Manchester, the fourth of his parents' five children. His father worked as a furrier. He attended the nearby Stretford Grammar School and worked for two years in the textile industry before moving on to Liverpool University from which in 1954 he emerged with a degree in Economics.

=== Coal and computers ===
Between 1954 and 1959 he worked initially in a team directed by the Medical Research Council examining and reporting on working conditions, above and below ground, of miners employed in the North Wales Area of the National Coal Board, Britain's nationalised coal mines operator. Following this, he worked in the same Area for the Coal Board itself leading a team installing new costing systems in collieries. After a brief period at the British Cotton Industry Research Organisation, where he advised on re-equipment proposals for textile mills, he moved on again, in 1961, to the English Electric Computer Company (EECC) which had emerged from the pioneering computer development undertaken under the auspices of the J. Lyons bakeries and catering conglomerate during the 1940s and 1950s. At EECC he became the area sales manager for North-west England.

His next move, in 1966, was to the National Computing Centre, a government-established not-for-profit membership and research organisation, based in Manchester. Here he rose through the hierarchy, serving as deputy director between 1975 and 1984. and served on its Board. The NCC was part of Harold Wilson's "White hot technological revolution" and was charged with promoting the efficient use of computing in the United Kingdom. Eric Howe joined the NCC at its inception and wrote its Corporate Plan for a House of Commons Committee investigating the computing industry, where, because of the colour of its covers, it was referred to as "The Little Red Book of Chairman Howe". On a number of occasions he supported Civil Servants at meetings on the computer industry in Brussels and was a member of the NEDO Computer Panel. He was also on the Regional Council of the CBI. He was responsible for the centre's activities in support of education and training and commercial computing. He was Chairman of the National Computer Users Forum which facilitated an exchange of views with those in government establishing computing policies. The European Commission invited him to lead in establishing a similar body for the European Union and he went on to be its UK representative.

=== Data protection ===
A need for data protection had been identified during the early 1970s in West Germany where the role of "Data Protection Registrar" had been developed, most notably, by Spiros Simitis. The British government of that time had only limited interest in computers and data privacy, but enacted the necessary legislation in 1984 because of concerns that British businesses and agencies would otherwise be at risk of exclusion from information sharing with overseas partners. Howe's initial approach was consciously cautious and low-key. Nevertheless, he remained in post for ten years, which was longer than any of his successors. A commentator looking back on his time as Data Protection Registrar would describe him as "avuncular but terrier-like". A report in the Daily Telegraph described him as having the "soft cotton accent and open joviality of a Manchester corner grocer" and went on to say this could be "dangerously deceptive".

The Data Protection Act 1984 was the first legislation in the United Kingdom to address the use of computers. It gave new rights for individuals to find what information was held on computers about them. It also introduced new obligations for computer users processing personal data who needed to be open about their activities by putting details of these on a public register. Users must also follow the good practice laid down in a number of Principles. These Principles would need to be interpreted and applied consistently to the myriad of circumstances in which personal data would be used. The Registrar was placed in a position of independence reporting directly to Parliament. The Registrar was responsible for ensuring individual's rights; establishing the Register; interpreting the Principles and assisting and encouraging the adoption of appropriate good practice; enforcing the legislation and the jurisprudence which would ensue; raising awareness of data protection throughout the United Kingdom; and engaging with data protection developments in the European Union and worldwide to contribute a United Kingdom view and learn from experience in other legislations.

In his First Report in June 1985, Eric Howe listed over fifty group organisations representing all aspects of public, commercial and individual interests, with whom he had held discussions on the operation of the Act. Subsequent Reports dealt in detail with the activities of his Office with regard to each of his responsibilities. He undertook research into public concerns and as a result directed early attention to the use of personal data for credit referencing and direct marketing. His last Annual Report in 1994 refers to work in areas as diverse as Health, Police and Criminal Justice, Open Government, Banking, Insurance and Local Government. As part of his Fifth Report he set out the results of a wide-ranging survey of experience of the Act and proposed a number of changes which would benefit both individuals and computer users. In all his Reports he gave credit to a loyal, hard-working and very professional staff.

In a Personal Note to his Ninth Report in June 1993, Eric Howe said that data protection represents a massive long term educational exercise to change the attitudes and practices of a Nation. The Conclusions to his final Report in 1994 set out a perspective on the development of computing and the use of personal data. He refers to the problem of balancing conflicting public policies. How should privacy balance against freedom of speech, or the health of the nation, or the prevention of crime, or economic benefit? He also alludes to the power which knowledge and control of information about people might place in the hands of a totalitarian state. He describes justice, freedom and democracy as fragile flowers.

Eric Howe gave evidence to a number of Parliamentary Committees and in 1994 the House of Commons Committee of Public Accounts concluded that the registrar had carried out much good work in a difficult remit with limited resources and in rapidly changing circumstances.

=== Later career ===
Eric Howe was appointed Commander of the Order of the British Empire (CBE) in the 1990 Birthday Honours. He was a Fellow of the British Computer Society and served twice on its Council and a Fellow of the Institute of Data Processing Management. He undertook voluntary work, before retirement as Chairman of an Older People's Welfare Committee and after retirement as a board member and Chairman of a Housing Association.

== Personal ==
Howe married Patricia Schollick at Blackpool in 1967. The births of their two daughters followed in 1969 and 1971.

Government offices
Preceded by new post	Data Protection Registrar; 1984 - 1994	Succeeded by Elizabeth France
