= Gaskin v United Kingdom =

Gaskin v UK (1989) 12 EHRR 36 was a legal case from the United Kingdom, heard by the European Court of Human Rights in Strasbourg.

== Facts ==
Graham Gaskin was placed in public care in the UK as a baby, where he stayed until he reached his maturity. Gaskin claimed he had been abused during his time in care and he requested access to the records kept on him by Liverpool Social Services. Liverpool City Council gave Gaskin partial access, claiming that a duty of confidentiality owed to third party contributors prohibited disclosure of the remainder of his records. Gaskin appealed to the Court of Appeal which upheld Liverpool City Council's refusal to give him access. The Court of Appeal held that it was not in the 'public interest' to grant access to Gaskin's records because to do so would inhibit third party informants from coming forward with information to Social Services. Granting access would necessarily reveal the identities of these third parties. The Court of Appeal therefore felt that access would undermine the British system which depends on information being supplied to the Authorities by the public 'in confidence'.

== Appeal ==
Gaskin appealed to the European Court of Human Rights in Strasbourg and his case was decided in 1989. The Court decided that Gaskin's Article 8 right to have his private and family life respected by the State had been breached by the British government because there had been no independent appeal body to which Gaskin could have taken his case. The Court also decided that people in Gaskin's position, who had been in public care as children, should not in principle be obstructed from accessing their care records—these records acted as the memories of parents, to which most individuals had access but to which people in Gaskin's position did not.

== Impact ==
The Gaskin case has had a substantial impact on British law. The Data Protection Act contains special provisions whereby social services records are accessible by people formerly in public care irrespective of whether the records are kept electronically or within a paper-based filing system. At the time of the case, only information stored electronically was accessible by individuals under the UK's Data Protection regime; it now covers computer systems and any other filing system. The Information Commission now provides the independent appeal mechanism absent at the time when Gaskin sought access to his case file.

In summary, the Gaskin case was a significant victory for individuals who were placed in public care as children. Such individuals now have limited access to their own records to the extent that knowledge and understanding of their childhood and early development will be revealed. However, the case files of individuals who were placed in care with the independent sector (the charities) are not caught by the access provisions of the Data Protection Act. Access to these files can only be obtained with the agreement of these organisations.
