= John Edwards (regulator) =

UK Information Commissioner; New Zealand lawyer

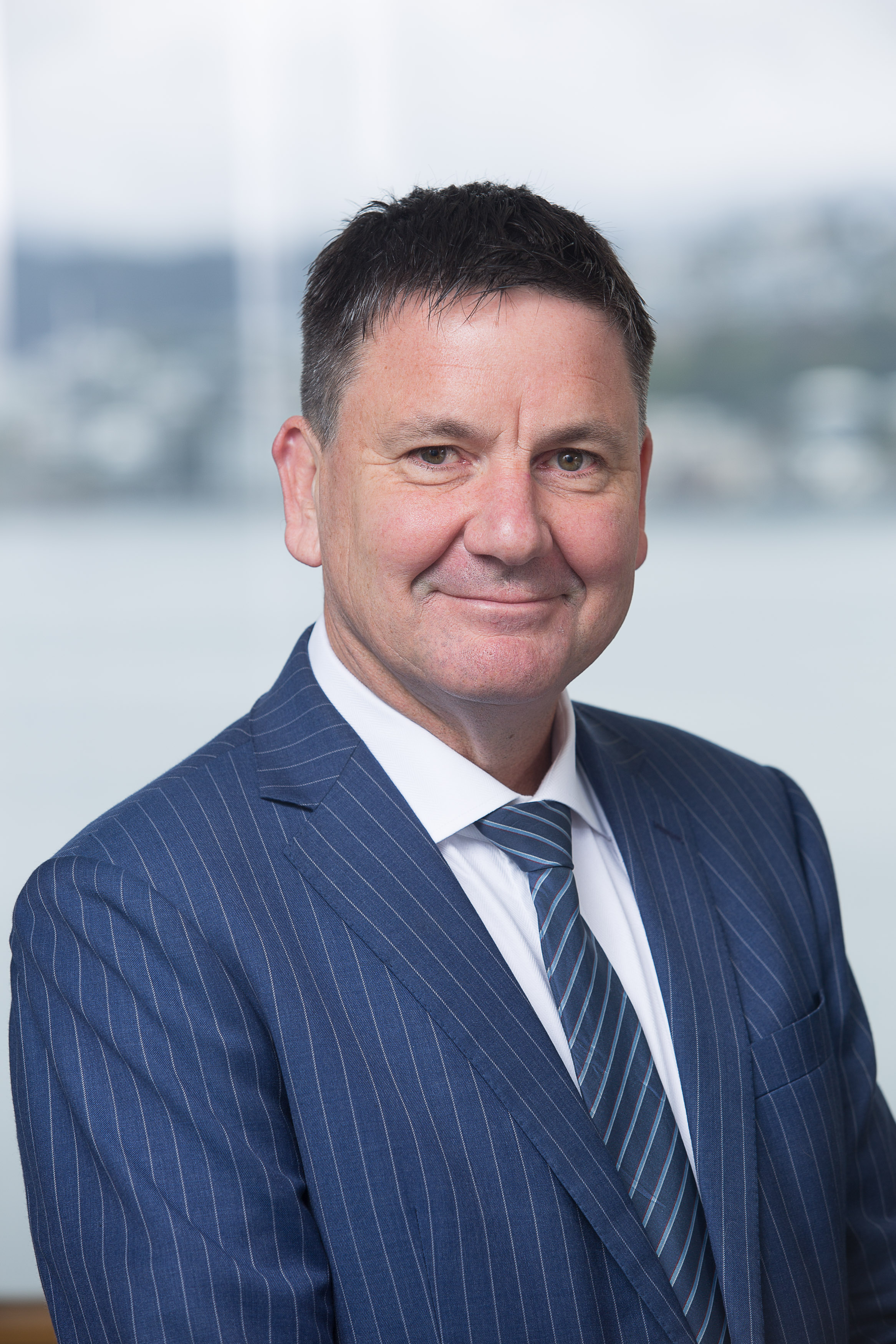
- Edwards in 2018

Sixth Information Commissioner
- In office 3 January 2022 – 19 June 2026
- Preceded by: Elizabeth Denham

Third Privacy Commissioner
- In office 17 February 2014 – 31 December 2021
- Preceded by: Marie Shroff

Personal details
- Citizenship: New Zealand
- Education: Victoria University of Wellington

John Edwards is a former New Zealand public servant who was the New Zealand Privacy Commissioner from 2014 to 2021, then the United Kingdom Information Commissioner from 2022 until his resignation in 2026, after an independent investigation determined that he had a "case to answer" in relation to allegations of sexual harassment, discrimination, and bullying.

On 19 June 2026, Edwards announced that he had resigned, just under seven months before his term was due to end. On his resignation, Edwards stated that he had "exercised poor judgement and made attempts at humour that were inappropriate and caused offence". Liz Kendall, the Secretary of State for Science, Innovation and Technology, stated that Edwards had used "vulgar and highly sexualised language ... with his staff", that she is "extremely concerned" that Edwards describes this as "misplaced humour", and that "multiple women" had felt "offended, shocked and uncomfortable" after speaking with Edwards.

== Personal life and career ==
Edwards was brought up in New Plymouth and practised law in Wellington for over 20 years specialising in information law. He also served as legal counsel for the New Zealand Families Commission from 2003 to 2013, and as a senior solicitor at the Ministry of Health from 1997 to 1999.

=== New Zealand Privacy Commissioner ===
Edwards was the New Zealand Privacy Commissioner, first appointed in 2014 and held the post until 31 December 2021. During his tenure he was also chairman of the Global Privacy Assembly from 2014 to 2017.

=== United Kingdom Information Commissioner ===
On 21 December 2021, Edwards was formally appointed by letters patent as the United Kingdom's sixth Information Commissioner, and took office on 3 January 2022.

==== HR Investigation and Resignation ====
On 25 April 2026, Edwards announced that he had "voluntarily stepped aside from [his] duties at the ICO while an independent investigation into HR matters is undertaken". The announcement came one day after POLITICO made enquiries to the ICO regarding Edwards’ work absence, which the ICO confirmed began on 26 February 2026.

During the investigation, Edwards agreed to "step back from all contact with ICO staff", "not enter ICO offices", and not "represent the ICO publicly". It was confirmed that Paul Arnold (Chief Executive) and the executive team continued to lead the ICO in accordance with the ICO's scheme of delegation. In a reply to a Freedom of Information Act Request, the ICO confirmed on 27 May 2026 that Edwards would continue to earn his salary during his leave of absence.

On 10 June 2026, the ICO announced that the independent investigation had concluded, finding that "there is a case to answer", but did not disclose any further details. As the Commissioner is accountable to Parliament, and not "employed" by the ICO, the next steps will be determined by the Department for Science, Innovation and Technology. As a result of the investigation findings, Edwards is deemed "temporarily unable to act in fulfilling his responsibilities", which triggers a temporary transfer of responsibilities to Edwards' Deputy Commissioner, Paul Arnold.

On 19 June 2026, Edwards announced that he had resigned. In his announcement, he stated that he did not agree with how the investigation had been conducted, but "accepted that there had been occasions where [he] exercised poor judgement and made attempts at humour that were inappropriate and caused offence", and "recognised that [his] position had become untenable". In a separate statement, the ICO confirmed Edwards' resignation, stating that the investigation made clear that Edwards' behaviour "fell short of the conduct expected from a public official".

Liz Kendall, UK Secretary of State for Science, Innovation and Technology, stated on 19 June that she had "seen evidence of the vulgar and highly sexualised language that was used in [Edwards'] interactions with his staff", and that she is "extremely concerned" that Edwards "describe[s] these incidents as misplaced humour". She says that "[m]ultiple women shared testimony to the investigator on feeling offended, shocked and uncomfortable following interactions with [Edwards]."

The ICO released a further statement on 20 June, stating:

"Mr Edwards' actions were completely at odds with our values. We do not accept sexual harassment, bullying or discrimination in any form and have clear policies in place to deal with issues such as these. We're committed to ensuring a safe culture where all staff are able to raise concerns, knowing they will be taken seriously and trusting that action will be taken where appropriate. This must include concerns raised about the behaviour of the holder of the important and privileged role of Information Commissioner. Our priority continues to be providing a safe and supportive environment for our staff. We have been unable to comment as the investigation was ongoing, but our utmost focus has always been on supporting those affected. We thank all ICO colleagues for their professionalism and especially those who courageously shared their experiences as part of the independent investigation."

At a Science, Innovation and Technology Select Committee meeting on 8 July, Liz Kendall revealed that Edwards was preparing to file legal papers against one of the female employees who had raised concerns about him, and she was "appalled by that behaviour".

Government offices
Preceded by Marie Shroff	Privacy Commissioner (New Zealand); 2014–2021	Succeeded by Liz MacPherson as Acting Privacy Commissioner
Preceded by Elizabeth Denham	Information Commissioner (United Kingdom); 2022–2026	Succeeded by Paul Arnold as Interim Chief Executive and Deputy Information Commissioner
