= King and Country debate =

1933 debate at the Oxford Union Society

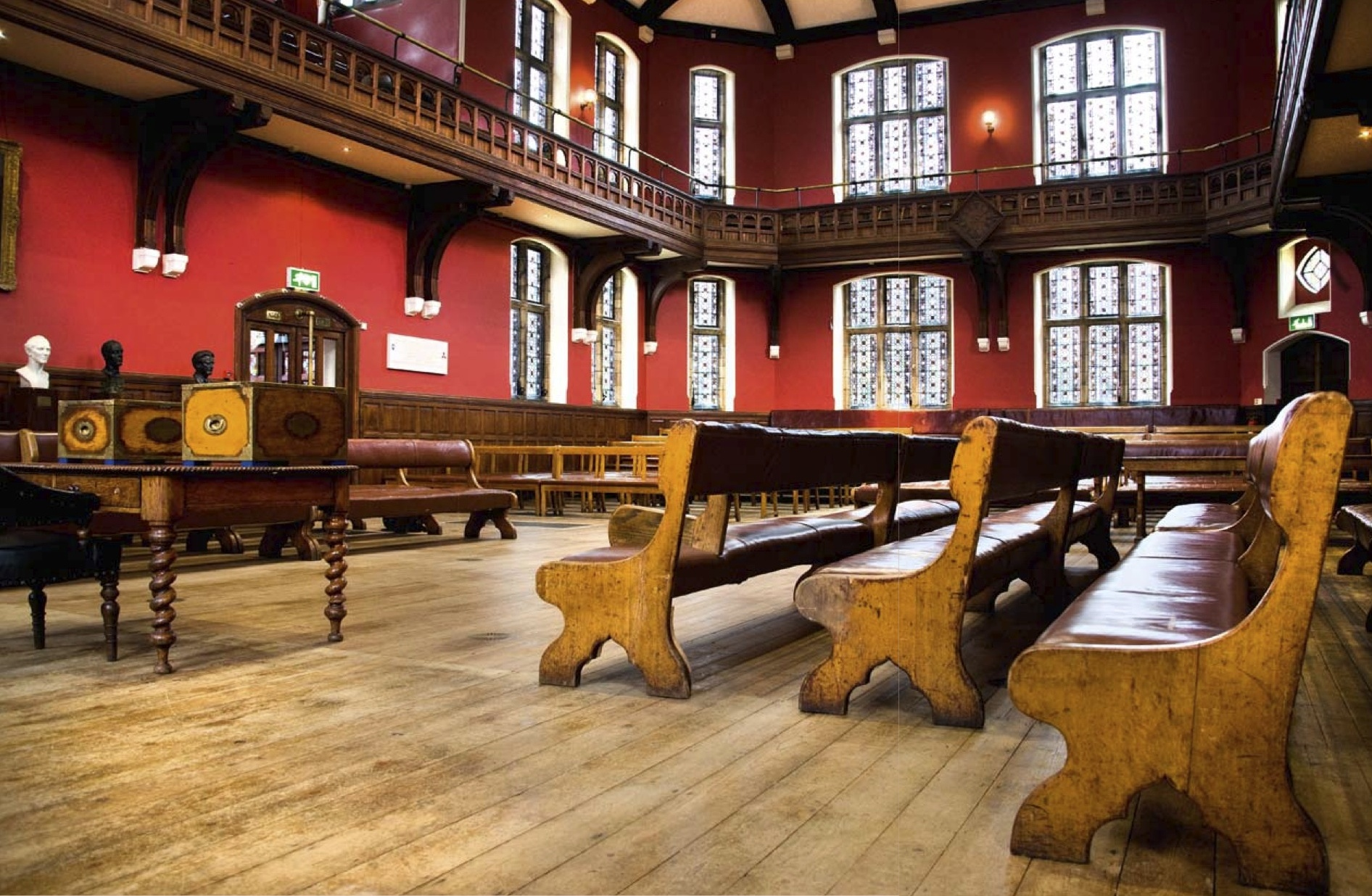
The Oxford Union debating chamber.

The King and Country Debate was a debate on 9 February 1933 at the Oxford Union Society. The motion presented, "That this House will under no circumstances fight for its King and country", passed with 275 votes for the motion and 153 against it. The motion would later be named the Oxford Oath or the Oxford Pledge.

It became one of the most controversial topics held within the Union, driving debate between the older and younger generations about patriotism and pacifism, and whether this motion would actually help or hurt war prevention efforts. Winston Churchill claimed that the Oxford Oath affected certain decisions made by Adolf Hitler during World War II. American pacifists would take their own version of the pledge, and several anti-war strikes would take place with the pledge as the main drive.

== Background ==
Prior to the debate, a similar motion had been proposed at the Cambridge Union by Arthur Ponsonby in March 1927: "That lasting peace can only be secured by the people of England adopting an uncompromising attitude of pacifism". The motion was passed by 213 votes to 138 and attracted no public attention.

The Oxford Union motion was proposed by Kenelm Hubert Digby of St John's College and opposed by K. R. F. Steel-Maitland of Balliol College. Among other speakers, Quintin Hogg argued against it. Digby found some difficulty obtaining a noted speaker to support the motion: Norman Angell, Bertrand Russell, Beverley Nichols and John Strachey were all unable to attend. Finally, philosopher C. E. M. Joad agreed to come and support the motion. Joad and David Maurice Graham of Balliol, the Union's Librarian at the time and the original drafter of the motion, argued in favour at the debate. The teller for the Ayes was Max Beloff and that for the Noes was R. G. Thomas. The President of the Union was Frank Hardie.

== Debate ==
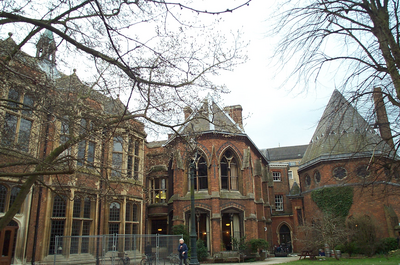
The Oxford Union

Digby addressed the packed chamber: "It is no mere coincidence that the only country fighting for the cause of peace, Soviet Russia, is the country that has rid itself of the war-mongering clique. The justification urged for the last war was that it was a war to end war. If that were untrue it was a dastardly lie; if it were true, what justification is there for opposition to this motion tonight?"

Isis, a student magazine of the University of Oxford, reported that Digby had a "tub-thumping style of oratory which would be more appreciated in Hyde Park than in the Union". Hogg argued that the policy that Digby advocated would cause, not prevent, war. In his opinion, a powerful Britain was a factor for peace and a disarmed Britain would have no more influence for peace in Europe than it had in the Far East, with the Japanese invasion of Manchuria.

Joad delivered what was described as a "tour de force of pacifist rhetoric". He claimed that the motion really meant "that this House will never commit murder on a huge scale whenever the Government decided it should do so" and argued that although limited wars might have been justified in the past, the scale of destruction now possible with modern weapons meant that war had become unthinkable. Joad also postulated that any invasion of Britain could be defeated by a Gandhian campaign of nonviolence.

All told, there were five opening speakers, nine others supporting the motion and ten against. Future Oxford Union President David Lewis was the eighth of the nine speakers in support of the motion. When the motion was put, President Frank Hardie declared it carried, 275 votes to 153. Digby went to shake hands with Hogg, but his opponent refused to do so.

== Reaction ==
A Fellow of Pembroke College, Oxford, R. B. McCallum, claimed that the "sensation created when this resolution was passed was tremendous. It received world-wide publicity.... Throughout England people, especially elderly people, were thoroughly shocked. Englishmen who were in India at the time have told me of the dismay they felt when they heard of it.... 'What is wrong with the younger generation?' was the general query". Initially, the debate gained little media attention, but the Daily Telegraph ran an article about the debate headlined "DISLOYALTY AT OXFORD: GESTURE TOWARDS THE REDS". The Daily Express wrote: "There is no question but that the woozy-minded Communists, the practical jokers, and the sexual indeterminates of Oxford have scored a great success in the publicity that has followed this victory.... Even the plea of immaturity, or the irresistible passion of the undergraduate for posing, cannot excuse such a contemptible and indecent action as the passing of that resolution".

The Manchester Guardian responded differently: "The obvious meaning of this resolution [is] youth's deep disgust with the way in which past wars for 'King and Country' have been made, and in which, they suspect, future wars may be made; disgust at the national hypocrisy which can fling over the timidities and follies of politicians, over base greeds and communal jealousies and jobbery, the cloak of an emotional symbol they did not deserve". Part of the controversy arose because some newspapers falsely claimed that the supporters of the motion had insulted King George V (in fact, the British monarchy had been barely mentioned in the debate) or the British soldiers killed in World War I.

A Daily Express reporter claimed to have found the Mayor of Oxford, Alderman C. H. Brown, and his wife sitting in front of the fire reading their bibles, with Brown claiming, "I say that as mayor of a city that fathers a university of such foreign communistic sentiments, I am ashamed". Cambridge University was reported to have threatened to pull out of that year's Boat Race because of "incompatibility of temperament". An anonymous critic sent the Oxford Union a box containing 275 white feathers, one for each vote for the resolution. A second box followed, and Hardie announced that each member who had voted 'aye' could have two feathers. Winston Churchill condemned the motion in a speech on 17 February 1933 to the Anti-Socialist and Anti-Communist Union, in the knowledge that ten days beforehand Adolf Hitler had become chancellor of Germany: "That abject, squalid, shameless avowal... It is a very disquieting and disgusting symptom":

My mind turns across the narrow waters of Channel and the North Sea, where great nations stand determined to defend their national glories or national existence with their lives. I think of Germany, with its splendid clear-eyed youths marching forward on all the roads of the Reich singing their ancient songs, demanding to be conscripted into an army; eagerly seeking the most terrible weapons of war; burning to suffer and die for their fatherland. I think of Italy, with her ardent Fascisti, her renowned Chief, and stern sense of national duty. I think of France, anxious, peace-loving, pacifist to the core, but armed to the teeth and determined to survive as a great nation in the world. One can almost feel the curl of contempt upon the lips of the manhood of all these people when they read this message sent out by Oxford University in the name of young England.

and "caused reverberations around the world". It has been claimed by Joseph Alsop that the resolution made a tremendous impression upon Adolf Hitler and that he regularly cited it when his general staff protested against his military decisions. Churchill would, after the war, write on how Japan and Germany too took note of the Joad resolution, which altered their way of thinking about Britain as "decadent, degenerate... and swayed many [of their] calculations". While he would emphasize that the outcome of the debate would encourage some of the actions that Adolf Hitler would take, these were most likely to draw away from the Conservative Party's support of Neville Chamberlain's acts of appeasement. By contrast, Joad, A. A. Milne and Francis Wrigley Hirst all publicly defended the resolution. Hirst later argued in his book, Consequences of the War to Great Britain (1934), that the resolution did not rule out wars of self-defence, only imperialist conflicts. John Alfred Spender and James Louis Garvin took issue with the resolution, which, in their view, neglected the issue of war prevention.

In March 1933, the Oxford Pledge was adopted by the University of Manchester and the University of Glasgow. However, in the dominions of the British Empire, the University of Melbourne, the University of Toronto and the University of Cape Town all passed motions affirming that they would fight for King and Country. Three weeks after it was passed, Randolph Churchill proposed a resolution at the Oxford Union to delete the "King and Country" motion from the Union's records but was defeated by 750 votes to 138, in a rowdy debate, where Churchill was met by a barrage of hisses and stink bombs. A bodyguard of Oxford Conservatives and police escorted Churchill back to his hotel, after the debate. Charles Kimber, who would later lead the peace group Federal Union, was present at the debate, and later argued the vote was a protest against nationalist wars, not war in general. Kimber noted that several of the motion's supporters later fought with the Republicans during the Spanish Civil War.

Speaking after the debate, Digby said: "I believe that the motion was representative neither of the majority of the undergraduates of Oxford nor of the youth of this country. I am certain if war broke out tomorrow the students of the university would flock to the recruiting office as their fathers and uncles did." He was proved right: when World War II broke out in September 1939, the War Office organised a recruiting board at Oxford, which invited undergraduates and resident postgraduates under 25 to enlist: 2,632, out of a potential 3,000, volunteered. McCallum recalled at the outbreak of war two students, "men of light and leading in their college and with a good academic record" visited him to say goodbye before leaving to join their units. Both of them had separately said that if they had to vote on the "King and Country" resolution then and there, they would do so. One of them said: "I am not going to fight for King and Country, and you will notice that no one, not Chamberlain, not Halifax, has asked us to".

Telford Taylor, chief United States prosecutor at the Nuremberg trials, wrote "the 'King and Country' debate was a colorful reflection of the British temper between the two great wars. Exhausted and disgusted by the prolonged bloodbath in Flanders Fields, wracked by internal economic strains and already tiring of the burdens of empire, neither the people nor their leaders were in any mood to embark on new crusades". Sixty years after the event, Digby mused, "It was just a debate. I don't know what all the fuss was about. Frank Hardie had asked me to propose the motion and I agreed. That's all there was to it. But ever since the debate security intelligence organisations seem to have taken an interest in me." Certainly Digby's subsequent career in Sarawak and the United Kingdom suffered by his association with the debate.

== Foreign reaction ==
In a speech in the House of Commons on 30 July 1934, the Liberal MP Robert Bernays described a visit he made to Germany:

I remember very vividly, a few months after the famous pacifist resolution at the Oxford Union visiting Germany and having a talk with a prominent leader of the young Nazis. He was asking about this pacifist motion and I tried to explain it to him. There was an ugly gleam in his eye when he said, "The fact is that you English are soft". Then I realized that the world enemies of peace might be the pacifists.

The 18-year-old Patrick Leigh Fermor, who was walking across Europe in 1934, "dreaded" being asked in Germany about the resolution, and tried to explain it: "A kind of joke, really...I could detect a kindling glint of scornful pity and triumph in the surrounding eyes which declared quite plainly their certainty that, were I right, England was too far gone in degeneracy and frivolity to present a problem". Benito Mussolini was particularly struck by the sentiment expressed by the undergraduates and became convinced that the Joad declaration proved that Britain was a "frightened, flabby old woman". While considering whether to take British threats seriously while embarking on his Abyssinia adventure Mussolini often referred to the Joad declaration on why he ignored British demands.

The resolution "made a lot of noise in the world" and "caused reverberations around the world". It has been claimed by Joseph Alsop that the resolution made a tremendous impression upon Adolf Hitler and that he regularly cited it when his general staff protested against his military decisions. Martin Ceadel, reviewing the German coverage of the "King and Country Debate", notes that although it was widely covered in Germany, the Nazis did not seem to have made political capital out of it: "indeed, the London correspondent of the Völkischer Beobachter was in 1933 stressing rather the militarism of British youth". Shortly before the outbreak of war in 1939, the Völkischer Beobachter was still "insisting that the Oxford debate was insignificant".

=== United States ===
Some American college students sympathetic to the idea of pacifism adopted the oath under different words to fit the difference in governments: anyone who took the oath vowed "not to support the government of the United States in any war it might conduct." A demonstration was planned and under the joint efforts of the Student League for Industrial Democracy and the National Student League to promote this new oath. On 13 April 1934, all participating students would walk out of classes mid lecture and take the American Oxford Oath. Approximately 25,000 students would participate in the protest nationwide, with 15,000 of those participants being from New York City. The New York Times reported that most strikes were peaceful, except for one encounter between the police and students at City College:

"A student speaker who ignored Dr. Dean Gottschall's appeal and began a harangue was pushed from a perch near the flagpole by Sergeant Anthony Bucarelli of the Military Science Department. Other students, one after the other, were hoisted to shoulders of comrades to speak a few words before the police made them get down. This developed into a sort of game, with the students yelling, 'Cops off the campus! Cops off the campus!' and the policeman grinning broadly as they stopped the speeches."

On 12 April 1935, 60,000 college students signed a United States equivalent of the resolution, calling it the Oxford Oath, swearing never to take up arms on behalf of king or country. At Columbia University, 3,000 students took the Oath that day during a rally featuring Roger Baldwin, Reinhold Niebuhr and James Wechsler as speakers.

=== 1983 debate ===
The Oxford Union addressed the same question again 50 years later, on 9 February 1983 (the 50th anniversary of the original debate): ''That this House would not fight for Queen and Country". Beloff returned to oppose the motion: "Those of us who voted for the original motion have perhaps a duty to make atonement and warn against the foolish arrogance of making statements that were factually and morally untrue." He then stated that many of the proponents of the original motion had in fact gone on to fight and even die during World War II, and that simply tabling the motion had implied that the people of the United Kingdom would be unwilling to fight in another war. Helen John spoke in favour of the motion, citing the American bases already on British soil, and arguing that American actions in Latin America were no different from the Soviets' involvement in Poland and Afghanistan. The outcome of the vote was a major reversal of the original 1933 result, with 416 noes to 187 ayes.

== Disappearance ==
The official framed copy of the oath was stolen in 2004.

== Bibliography ==
Notes

References

- Churchill, Winston S. (1986). The Gathering Storm (1986 ed.). Houghton Mifflin Harcourt. ISBN 978-0-395-41055-4.
- Cohen, Robert (1997). When the Old Left Was Young: Student Radicals and America's First Mass Student Movement, 1929–41. Oxford University Press.
- McCallum, R. B. (1944). Public Opinion and the Last Peace (1944 ed.). Oxford University Press.
- Morris, Jan (2002). The Oxford Book of Oxford. Oxford University Press.
