= Lancelot Graham =

British colonial administrator

Sir Lancelot Graham as Governor of Sindh

Sir Lancelot Graham, KCSI, KCIE (1880–1958) was an Indian civil servant during the British Raj. He served as the first Governor of Sind from 1 April 1936 to 31 March 1941.

During his governorship, in order to encourage notables of the province, letters of appreciation were issued to various politicians and landlords of Sind for their public service to their territories and the country as a whole. One of his principal advisers was Sir Shah Nawaz Bhutto, father of the later prime minister of Pakistan Zulfikar Ali Bhutto. Khan Sahib Shahal Khan Khoso also received letters of appreciation from Graham. Graham appointed Khan Bahadur Ghulam Nabi Kazi MBE as his first Director of Public Instruction to head the Education Sector in Sindh. Upon Kazi's retirement in 1939, he appointed Dr Umar Bin Muhammad Daudpota to that position. While governor, he laid the foundation stone for the Sindh Assembly building on March 11, 1940.

He was appointed a CIE in 1924, knighted with the KCIE in 1930 and appointed a KCSI in 1936. He was educated at St Paul's School, London and Balliol College, Oxford.

His son, David Maurice Graham, was a broadcaster with the BBC External Broadcasting Services, and his grandson, Christopher Graham, became the UK's Information Commissioner in 2009

Government offices
Preceded by New Office	Governors of Sind; 1936–1941	Succeeded by Sir Hugh Dow
