= Privacy and Electronic Communications (EC Directive) Regulations 2003 =

- Statutory Instrument
- Parliament of the United Kingdom
- Citation: SI 2003/2426
- Introduced by: Stephen Timms (Commons)

Dates
- Made: 18 September 2003
- Laid before Parliament: 18 September 2003
- Commencement: 11 December 2003

Other legislation
- Amends: Telecommunications (Lawful Business Practice) (Interception of Communications) Regulations 2000; Electronic Communications (Universal Service) Order 2003
- Repeals/revokes: Telecommunications (Data Protection and Privacy) Regulations 1999; Telecommunications (Data Protection and Privacy) (Amendment) Regulations 2000
- Made under: European Communities Act 1972
- Transposes: ePrivacy Directive

Status: Current legislation

Text of statute as originally enacted

Text of the Privacy and Electronic Communications (EC Directive) Regulations 2003 as in force today (including any amendments) within the United Kingdom, from legislation.gov.uk.

The Privacy and Electronic Communications (EC Directive) Regulations 2003 (SI 2003/2426) is a law in the United Kingdom which made it unlawful to, amongst other things, transmit an automated recorded message for direct marketing purposes via a telephone, without prior consent of the subscriber. The law implements an EU directive, the Privacy and Electronic Communications Directive 2002.

One of the key tenets of this legislation upholds that it is unlawful to send someone direct marketing if they have not specifically granted permission (via an opt-in agreement) in the absence of a previous relationship between the parties. Organisations cannot merely add people's details to their marketing database and offer an opt out after they have started sending direct marketing. For this reason the regulations offer increased consumer protection from direct marketing.

The regulations can be enforced against an offending company or individual anywhere in the European Union. The Information Commissioner's Office has responsibility for the enforcement of unsolicited e-mails and considers complaints about breaches. A breach of an enforcement notice is a criminal offence subject to a fine of up to £500,000 depending on the circumstances.
