= Information Commission's Office =

Non-departmental public body

Information Commission
- Established: 1984; 42 years ago
- Type: non-departmental public body
- Headquarters: Circle Square
- Location: Manchester, United Kingdom
- Origins: Data Protection Act 1984
- Region served: United Kingdom
- Chair of the Information Commission: Maggie Carver (interim)
- Parent organisation: Department for Digital, Culture, Media and Sport
- Revenue: £75,992,000 (2024/2025)
- Expenses: £91,425,000 (2024/2025)
- Staff: 1,051 (2025)
- Website: ico.org.uk
- Formerly called: Data Protection Registrar; The Information Commissioner's Office

The Information Commission (ICO) is a non-departmental public body which reports directly to the Parliament of the United Kingdom and is sponsored by the Department for Digital, Culture, Media and Sport (DCMS). It is the independent regulatory office (national data protection authority) dealing with the Data Protection Act 2018, the General Data Protection Regulation, and the Privacy and Electronic Communications (EC Directive) Regulations 2003 across the UK; and the Freedom of Information Act 2000 and the Environmental Information Regulations 2004 in England, Wales and Northern Ireland and, to a limited extent, in Scotland.

The Data (Use and Access) Act 2025 provided for the abolition of the office of Information Commissioner and the transfer of functions to a new body, the Information Commission. The transition to the new governance structure was completed on 30 September 2026.

The role of Chair of the Information Commission is currently vacant, with Deputy Chair Maggie Carver acting as interim chair since 30 September 2026. John Edwards resigned as Commissioner on 19 June 2026 after an independent workplace investigation found that there was a case to answer.

== History ==
=== Data Protection Registrar (1984–1998) ===
The Data Protection Act 1984 created the office of the Data Protection Registrar with whom people processing personal data had to register the fact of their processing of that data on the register of data controllers.

Eric Howe was appointed as the first registrar and held office from 1984 until 1994. He was succeeded by Elizabeth France, who continued serving in office until 2002.

=== Data Protection Commissioner (1998–2001) ===
Following the enactment of EC Directive 95/46, the Data Protection Act 1998 was passed, which renamed the office of the Data Protection Registrar to the office of the Data Protection Commissioner.

=== Information Commissioner (2001–2026) ===
The Freedom of Information Act 2000 gave the responsibility of enforcement to the commissioner and, as part of its broader mandate, the office was renamed in 2001 to the office of the Information Commissioner.

In 2003 the Information Commissioner's powers were expanded to include enforcement of the UK's implementation of the ePrivacy Directive, the Privacy and Electronic Communications (EC Directive) Regulations 2003 (PECR). PECR applies to organisations that wish to send marketing messages through electronic means i.e. phone, fax, email, text; who use cookies or provide electronic communication services to the general public.

In 2004 the commissioner was also given the responsibility of enforcing the Environmental Information Regulations 2004.

Prior to 2010 the enforcement powers were limited to issuing enforcement notices and to pursuing those alleged to have broken the Data Protection Acts through the courts. In April 2010 The commissioner was granted the power to issue fines, known as monetary penalties, by their own authority. The first such were served on 24 November 2010. From 2010, the ICO were also given the powers to serve Assessment Notices, which can be issued to organisations who are unwilling to work alongside the ICO and are at risk of breaking the principles of the Data Protection Act 1998. During the Leveson Inquiry in 2012 it came to light that the ICO had felt unable to challenge the press related to allegations of breaches due to the power of the press and perceived weakness of its own powers.

In November 2011 the commissioner was given the powers to impose monetary penalties of up to £500,000 for breaches of PECR.

After the GDPR came in to force in 2018 the ICO gained new enforcement powers, including the ability to fine organisations €20 million (or equivalent in sterling) or 4% of the total annual worldwide turnover in the preceding financial year, whichever is higher, for breaching data protection laws.

==== Richard Thomas ====
Richard Thomas replaced France in 2002 and held the office of commissioner until 2009. During his tenure as Commissioner, the ICO was particularly noted for raising serious concerns over the Government's proposed British national identity card and database, as well as other similar databases such as the Citizen Information Project, Universal Child Database, and the NHS National Programme for IT, stating that the country was in danger of sleepwalking into a surveillance society, drawing attention to the misuse of such information by the former states of the Eastern bloc and Francisco Franco's Spain.

==== Christopher Graham ====
Christopher Graham was the information commissioner between 2009 and 2016. He raised concerns over harm and distress caused by nuisance calls.

==== Elizabeth Denham ====
Elizabeth Denham was the information commissioner between in 2016 and 2021. Following her appointment, the ICO undertook high-profile investigations into Equifax, Yahoo, Talk Talk, Uber, and Facebook; issuing the maximum fine under the Data Protection Act 1998 of £500,000 to Facebook, for breaches of data protection law. Denham also oversaw the conclusion of the ICO's investigation into charities' fundraising activities and a series of fines for companies behind nuisance marketing.

Denham welcomed the introduction of the General Data Protection Regulation (GDPR) that came into effect in May 2018, as well as the Data Protection Act 2018.

==== John Edwards ====
John Edwards was the information Commissioner from 2021 to 2026, and the last person to hold the office. The UK government said he would "go beyond the regulator's traditional role" and that the job would now be "balanced" between protecting rights and promoting "innovation and economic growth". It also said that protection for privacy should be done "in as light a touch way as possible", that it would prioritise allowing personal data to be sent internationally to places such as the United States, Korea, Singapore, Dubai and Colombia, among others, that it wanted a data policy that delivered a "Brexit dividend" for businesses (cf. individuals alone) and that it wanted to get rid of "endless" cookie popups.

===== Edwards' resignation =====
On 26 February 2026, Edwards stepped aside from his duties as commissioner while an independent investigation into unspecified HR matters was undertaken. On 10 June 2026, the ICO announced that the investigation has concluded, finding that there "is a case to answer". The matter sat with the Department of Science, Innovation and Technology for consideration. During Edwards' absence, the ICO was led by Paul Arnold (chief executive) and the wider executive team. At the conclusion of the investigation, Edwards was deemed "temporarily unable to act in fulfilling his responsibilities", triggering a formal temporary transfer of responsibilities to Paul Arnold. On 19 June 2026, Edwards announced that he had resigned, acknowledging that his position had become untenable, and accepting that there had been occasions where he "exercised poor judgement and made attempts at humour that were inappropriate and caused offence".

Liz Kendall, UK Secretary of State for Science, Innovation and Technology, subsequently announced an independent review into the culture, accountability and governance of the ICO, and her intention to appoint a majority-women board of non-executive directors.

=== Information Commission (2026–) ===
The Data (Use and Access) Act 2025 abolished the office of the Information Commissioner, replacing it with a corporate body known as the Information Commission, taking effect from 30 September 2026. The Information Commission has a governance board whose purpose is to make collective decisions about the strategic direction and performance of the Information Commission’s Office (ICO). The Board is also responsible for ensuring that effective arrangements are in place to provide assurance on governance, risk management, and internal control.

As of November 2026, the Government are currently recruiting someone for the position of Chair of the Information Commission.

== Legislation ==
=== Data Protection Act 1998 ===
The United Kingdom as a member of the European Union was, and as a former member still is, subject to a strict regime of data protection. The Data Protection Act 1984 created the post of the then named Data Protection Registrar.

=== Freedom of Information Act 2000 ===
In 2001 the Commissioner's role was expanded to include enforcement of the Freedom of Information Act 2000. Enforcement of the Freedom of Information (Scotland) Act 2002, which applies to devolved public authorities in Scotland, is the responsibility of the Scottish Information Commissioner, a separate public official, as the British Act does not apply to these authorities.

The ICO issues guidance on Freedom of Information legislation, which is being updated in accordance with its strategic plan 2019/20 - 2021/22, Openness by Design.

=== Privacy and Electronic Communications Regulations (EC Directive) 2003 (PECR) ===
In November 2011 the ICO was given the powers to impose monetary penalties of up to £500,000 for breaches of the Privacy and Electronic Communications Regulations (PECR). PECR applies to organisations that wish to send marketing messages through electronic means i.e. phone, fax, email, text; use cookies or provide electronic communication services to the general public. As with the GDPR, these regulations continue to apply following Brexit.

=== Environmental Information Regulations 2004 ===
The Information Commissioner is also responsible for appeals made under the Environmental Information Regulations 2004.

=== General Data Protection Regulation (GDPR) ===
The General Data Protection Regulation (GDPR) is a new, Europe-wide law that replaces the Data Protection Act 1998 in the UK. The GDPR came into force on 25 May 2018 and sets out requirements for how organisations need to handle personal data. It forms part of the data protection regime in the UK, together with the new Data Protection Act 2018 (DPA 2018). Following the UK's departure from the EU on 31 January 2020, the GDPR continues to be part of British domestic law by virtue of section 3 of the European Union (Withdrawal) Act 2018.

=== Data Protection Act 2018 ===
The Data Protection Act 2018 received royal assent on 23 May 2018. It updates data protection laws in the UK, supplementing the General Data Protection Regulation (GDPR), implementing the EU law enforcement directive, and extending data protection laws to areas not covered by the GDPR. The new Act aims to modernise data protection laws to ensure they are effective in the years to come.

The data protection charge on UK data controllers to support the Act is under the Data Protection (Charges and Information) Regulations 2018. Exemptions from the charge were left broadly the same as for the previous Act: largely some businesses and non-profits internal core purposes (staff or members, marketing and accounting), household affairs, some public purposes, and non-automated processing. The register of fee payers, which excludes those data controllers that are exempt from paying a fee, is publicly available and searchable at the website of the ICO, which also gives links to the ICO's counterparts around Europe.

== Investigations ==
=== Operation Motorman ===
In 2002, under 'Operation Motorman', the ICO under Richard Thomas raided various newspaper and private investigators' offices, looking for details of personal information kept on unregistered computer databases. The operation uncovered numerous invoices addressed to newspapers and magazines, which detailed prices for providing the journalists with personal information, with 305 journalists being identified as having been the recipients of a wide range of information.

In 2006, a request under the Freedom of Information Act led to the publication of a report to the British Parliament called "What Price Privacy Now?". The newspaper with the highest number of requests was the Daily Mail with 952 transactions by 58 journalists; the News of the World came fifth in the table, with 182 transactions from 19 journalists. The Daily Mail immediately issued a press release, in which it rejected the accusations within the report. Editor Paul Dacre said that Associated Newspapers only used private investigators to confirm public information, such as dates of birth.

In a July 2011 appearance in front of a parliamentary committee, a day after former News International CEO Rebekah Brooks had been arrested and bailed in light of the News International phone hacking scandal, Dacre told them that he had never "countenanced" phone hacking or blagging at his newspaper, as both acts were clearly "criminal".

=== Consulting Association ===
On 23 February 2009, the Droitwich office of the Consulting Association (TCA) was raided by the ICO, which served an enforcement notice against TCA under the terms of the Data Protection Act. The ICO action followed a 28 June 2008 article about alleged blacklisting in the construction industry, by journalist Phil Chamberlain, published in The Guardian.

=== Sony ===
In 2013, the Information Commissioner's Office fined Sony Computer Entertainment Europe Ltd. £250,000, when many PlayStation systems were hacked and the names, addresses, phone numbers and card details of users were stolen. The ICO found that Sony had excessive information about their users and inadequate security systems in place.

=== Nuisance calls ===
In March 2013, commenting on a fine of £90,000 imposed on Cumbernauld fitted kitchen company DM Design for nuisance marketing calls, the Information Commissioner said that "this fine will not be an isolated penalty. We know other companies are showing a similar disregard for the law and we've every intention of taking further enforcement action against companies that continue to bombard people with unlawful marketing texts and calls." In 2014, the Government changed the law to "lower the legal threshold for consumer harm". This made it easier for the ICO to "take enforcement action against more organisations breaching the Privacy and Electronic Communications Regulations (PECR)".

In October 2018 the ICO fined two companies a total of £250,000 that made nearly 1.73 million direct marketing phone calls to people registered with the Telephone Preference Service (TPS). In December 2018, the Commissioner welcomed the new law that means the ICO can now hold company bosses directly responsible and has the power to fine them personally for breaches of the Privacy and Electronic Communications Regulations (PECR).

=== Facial recognition use by Amazon and Facebook ===
May 2018 saw the increased scrutiny of both Facebook and Amazon with regards to reports of the use of biometric personal data without the consent of the subjects.

=== Cambridge Analytica and Facebook ===
On 23 March 2018, the ICO searched the London headquarters of Cambridge Analytica amid reports that the firm harvested the personal data of millions of Facebook users as part of a campaign to influence the U.S. 2016 presidential elections.

In October 2018 the ICO issued a fine of £500,000, the maximum allowable under the laws which applied at the time the incidents occurred, to Facebook, for breaches of data protection law. The ICO's investigation found that between 2007 and 2014, Facebook processed the personal information of users unfairly by allowing application developers (specifically, Aleksandr Kogan and his company GSR as clients of SCL Ltd and Cambridge Analytica) access to their information without sufficiently clear and informed consent, and allowing access even if users had not downloaded the app, but were simply 'friends' with people who had.

=== Uber ===
In November 2018 the ICO fined Uber £385,000 for failing to protect customers' personal information during a cyber-attack. A series of avoidable data security flaws allowed the personal details of around 2.7 million British customers to be accessed and downloaded by attackers from a cloud-based storage system operated by Uber's US parent company.

=== Equifax ===
In September 2018, the ICO issued Equifax Ltd with a £500,000 fine for failing to protect the personal information of up to 15 million British citizens during a cyber-attack in 2017. The incident, which happened between 13 May and 30 July 2017 in the US, affected 146 million customers globally.

=== TikTok ===
In February 2019, the ICO launched an investigation of the video-sharing platform and mobile application TikTok, following the fine its parent company ByteDance received from the United States' Federal Trade Commission, for collecting information from minors under the age of 13 in violation of the country's Children's Online Privacy Protection Act. Speaking to a parliamentary committee, Information Commissioner Elizabeth Denham said that the investigation focuses on the same issue of private data collection, as well as the kind of videos collected and shared by children online, as well as the platform's open messaging system which allows any adult to message any child. She noted that the company was potentially violating provisions in the GDPR which "requires the company to provide different services and different protections for children".

=== Interserve ===
In October 2022, Interserve was fined £4.4 million for a breach of data protection law in May 2020 which enabled hackers to access data on up to 113,000 Interserve employees. While a phishing email had been detected, the ICO said Interserve "failed to thoroughly investigate the suspicious activity". As a result, the attacker compromised 283 systems and 16 accounts, uninstalled the company's anti-virus solution, and encrypted the personal data of current and former employees. Interserve disputed that its staff and its response had been complacent. It said it had also sought to reduce risks in systems supporting ongoing operations at Tilbury Douglas and in Mitie Group. The fine was the fourth-largest ever demanded by the ICO.

== List of Information Commissioners ==
Information Commissioner
- Information Commissioner's Office
- Type: Corporation sole
- Reports to: Parliament of the United Kingdom
- Appointer: Queen Elizabeth II; by letters patent
- Term length: up to 7 years; non-renewable
- Constituting instrument: Data Protection Act 2018
- Precursor: Data Protection Registrar
- Formation: 1984
- First holder: Eric Howe
- Final holder: John Edwards
- Abolished: 2026
- Superseded by: Chair of the Information Commission
- Salary: £200,000 per year
- Website: www.ico.org.uk

- John Edwards (appointed 21 December 2021, took office 3 January 2022, resigned 19 June 2026)
- Elizabeth Denham (appointed 15 July 2016)
- Christopher Graham (appointed 29 June 2009)
- Richard Thomas (appointed 2 December 2002)
- Elizabeth France (appointed 1 September 1994)
- Eric Howe (appointed September 1984)

== See also ==
- Information privacy
- Information commissioner
- Departments of the United Kingdom Government
- Privacy International
- The United Kingdom Office of Communications (Ofcom)
- The United Kingdom Office of Gas and Electricity Markets (Ofgem)
- The United Kingdom Water Services Regulation Authority (Ofwat)
- Telephone Preference Service
- Data Protection Commissioner (Ireland)
- Category:Databases in the United Kingdom
- Operation Motorman (ICO investigation)
